

254001–254100 

|-bgcolor=#fefefe
| 254001 ||  || — || March 18, 2004 || Socorro || LINEAR || H || align=right data-sort-value="0.92" | 920 m || 
|-id=002 bgcolor=#fefefe
| 254002 ||  || — || March 19, 2004 || Socorro || LINEAR || H || align=right data-sort-value="0.94" | 940 m || 
|-id=003 bgcolor=#fefefe
| 254003 ||  || — || March 18, 2004 || Kitt Peak || Spacewatch || H || align=right data-sort-value="0.65" | 650 m || 
|-id=004 bgcolor=#FA8072
| 254004 ||  || — || March 23, 2004 || Socorro || LINEAR || H || align=right data-sort-value="0.82" | 820 m || 
|-id=005 bgcolor=#fefefe
| 254005 ||  || — || March 17, 2004 || Kitt Peak || Spacewatch || MAS || align=right data-sort-value="0.86" | 860 m || 
|-id=006 bgcolor=#fefefe
| 254006 ||  || — || March 24, 2004 || Anderson Mesa || LONEOS || H || align=right data-sort-value="0.87" | 870 m || 
|-id=007 bgcolor=#E9E9E9
| 254007 ||  || — || March 16, 2004 || Kitt Peak || Spacewatch || — || align=right | 1.3 km || 
|-id=008 bgcolor=#E9E9E9
| 254008 ||  || — || March 16, 2004 || Kitt Peak || Spacewatch || — || align=right | 1.2 km || 
|-id=009 bgcolor=#E9E9E9
| 254009 ||  || — || March 17, 2004 || Kitt Peak || Spacewatch || — || align=right | 1.6 km || 
|-id=010 bgcolor=#d6d6d6
| 254010 ||  || — || March 17, 2004 || Catalina || CSS || 3:2 || align=right | 9.5 km || 
|-id=011 bgcolor=#E9E9E9
| 254011 ||  || — || March 17, 2004 || Kitt Peak || Spacewatch || HNS || align=right | 1.4 km || 
|-id=012 bgcolor=#E9E9E9
| 254012 ||  || — || March 16, 2004 || Catalina || CSS || — || align=right | 1.4 km || 
|-id=013 bgcolor=#fefefe
| 254013 ||  || — || March 16, 2004 || Campo Imperatore || CINEOS || MAS || align=right data-sort-value="0.90" | 900 m || 
|-id=014 bgcolor=#E9E9E9
| 254014 ||  || — || March 17, 2004 || Kitt Peak || Spacewatch || — || align=right | 2.0 km || 
|-id=015 bgcolor=#E9E9E9
| 254015 ||  || — || March 19, 2004 || Palomar || NEAT || — || align=right | 1.8 km || 
|-id=016 bgcolor=#fefefe
| 254016 ||  || — || March 19, 2004 || Socorro || LINEAR || — || align=right | 1.0 km || 
|-id=017 bgcolor=#E9E9E9
| 254017 ||  || — || March 18, 2004 || Socorro || LINEAR || — || align=right | 2.6 km || 
|-id=018 bgcolor=#E9E9E9
| 254018 ||  || — || March 20, 2004 || Socorro || LINEAR || MAR || align=right | 1.4 km || 
|-id=019 bgcolor=#E9E9E9
| 254019 ||  || — || March 17, 2004 || Kitt Peak || Spacewatch || — || align=right | 1.4 km || 
|-id=020 bgcolor=#E9E9E9
| 254020 ||  || — || March 19, 2004 || Socorro || LINEAR || — || align=right data-sort-value="0.97" | 970 m || 
|-id=021 bgcolor=#E9E9E9
| 254021 ||  || — || March 20, 2004 || Socorro || LINEAR || — || align=right | 1.8 km || 
|-id=022 bgcolor=#E9E9E9
| 254022 ||  || — || March 22, 2004 || Socorro || LINEAR || — || align=right | 2.5 km || 
|-id=023 bgcolor=#fefefe
| 254023 ||  || — || March 20, 2004 || Socorro || LINEAR || NYS || align=right | 1.0 km || 
|-id=024 bgcolor=#E9E9E9
| 254024 ||  || — || March 20, 2004 || Socorro || LINEAR || — || align=right | 3.3 km || 
|-id=025 bgcolor=#E9E9E9
| 254025 ||  || — || March 24, 2004 || Anderson Mesa || LONEOS || — || align=right | 3.2 km || 
|-id=026 bgcolor=#E9E9E9
| 254026 ||  || — || March 22, 2004 || Socorro || LINEAR || MIS || align=right | 3.8 km || 
|-id=027 bgcolor=#E9E9E9
| 254027 ||  || — || March 27, 2004 || Socorro || LINEAR || ADE || align=right | 2.5 km || 
|-id=028 bgcolor=#E9E9E9
| 254028 ||  || — || March 27, 2004 || Socorro || LINEAR || HEN || align=right | 1.6 km || 
|-id=029 bgcolor=#E9E9E9
| 254029 ||  || — || March 27, 2004 || Socorro || LINEAR || — || align=right | 2.5 km || 
|-id=030 bgcolor=#E9E9E9
| 254030 ||  || — || March 22, 2004 || Anderson Mesa || LONEOS || EUN || align=right | 2.3 km || 
|-id=031 bgcolor=#E9E9E9
| 254031 ||  || — || March 26, 2004 || Kitt Peak || Spacewatch || — || align=right | 1.6 km || 
|-id=032 bgcolor=#E9E9E9
| 254032 ||  || — || March 19, 2004 || Socorro || LINEAR || ADE || align=right | 2.5 km || 
|-id=033 bgcolor=#E9E9E9
| 254033 ||  || — || March 26, 2004 || Kitt Peak || Spacewatch || — || align=right | 3.2 km || 
|-id=034 bgcolor=#fefefe
| 254034 ||  || — || March 27, 2004 || Socorro || LINEAR || MAS || align=right data-sort-value="0.90" | 900 m || 
|-id=035 bgcolor=#E9E9E9
| 254035 ||  || — || March 28, 2004 || Socorro || LINEAR || — || align=right | 2.0 km || 
|-id=036 bgcolor=#fefefe
| 254036 ||  || — || March 29, 2004 || Socorro || LINEAR || H || align=right data-sort-value="0.98" | 980 m || 
|-id=037 bgcolor=#E9E9E9
| 254037 ||  || — || April 9, 2004 || Siding Spring || SSS || — || align=right | 3.5 km || 
|-id=038 bgcolor=#d6d6d6
| 254038 ||  || — || April 12, 2004 || Palomar || NEAT || EUP || align=right | 7.1 km || 
|-id=039 bgcolor=#E9E9E9
| 254039 ||  || — || April 12, 2004 || Siding Spring || SSS || — || align=right | 2.8 km || 
|-id=040 bgcolor=#E9E9E9
| 254040 ||  || — || April 12, 2004 || Kitt Peak || Spacewatch || — || align=right data-sort-value="0.93" | 930 m || 
|-id=041 bgcolor=#E9E9E9
| 254041 ||  || — || April 13, 2004 || Catalina || CSS || — || align=right | 4.2 km || 
|-id=042 bgcolor=#fefefe
| 254042 ||  || — || April 15, 2004 || Siding Spring || SSS || H || align=right | 1.1 km || 
|-id=043 bgcolor=#E9E9E9
| 254043 ||  || — || April 11, 2004 || Palomar || NEAT || — || align=right | 2.3 km || 
|-id=044 bgcolor=#E9E9E9
| 254044 ||  || — || April 14, 2004 || Anderson Mesa || LONEOS || — || align=right | 3.0 km || 
|-id=045 bgcolor=#fefefe
| 254045 ||  || — || April 13, 2004 || Palomar || NEAT || H || align=right data-sort-value="0.92" | 920 m || 
|-id=046 bgcolor=#E9E9E9
| 254046 ||  || — || April 12, 2004 || Palomar || NEAT || — || align=right | 1.2 km || 
|-id=047 bgcolor=#E9E9E9
| 254047 ||  || — || April 13, 2004 || Kitt Peak || Spacewatch || — || align=right | 1.8 km || 
|-id=048 bgcolor=#E9E9E9
| 254048 ||  || — || April 15, 2004 || Anderson Mesa || LONEOS || — || align=right | 1.2 km || 
|-id=049 bgcolor=#E9E9E9
| 254049 ||  || — || April 12, 2004 || Palomar || NEAT || — || align=right | 1.9 km || 
|-id=050 bgcolor=#E9E9E9
| 254050 ||  || — || April 12, 2004 || Anderson Mesa || LONEOS || — || align=right | 1.9 km || 
|-id=051 bgcolor=#E9E9E9
| 254051 ||  || — || April 13, 2004 || Palomar || NEAT || — || align=right | 1.3 km || 
|-id=052 bgcolor=#E9E9E9
| 254052 ||  || — || April 12, 2004 || Kitt Peak || Spacewatch || — || align=right | 2.6 km || 
|-id=053 bgcolor=#E9E9E9
| 254053 ||  || — || April 12, 2004 || Kitt Peak || Spacewatch || XIZ || align=right | 1.5 km || 
|-id=054 bgcolor=#E9E9E9
| 254054 ||  || — || April 13, 2004 || Kitt Peak || Spacewatch || — || align=right | 4.2 km || 
|-id=055 bgcolor=#E9E9E9
| 254055 ||  || — || April 13, 2004 || Kitt Peak || Spacewatch || — || align=right | 3.5 km || 
|-id=056 bgcolor=#E9E9E9
| 254056 ||  || — || April 14, 2004 || Kitt Peak || Spacewatch || — || align=right | 2.7 km || 
|-id=057 bgcolor=#E9E9E9
| 254057 ||  || — || April 15, 2004 || Anderson Mesa || LONEOS || — || align=right | 2.3 km || 
|-id=058 bgcolor=#E9E9E9
| 254058 ||  || — || April 14, 2004 || Kitt Peak || Spacewatch || — || align=right | 2.9 km || 
|-id=059 bgcolor=#E9E9E9
| 254059 ||  || — || April 16, 2004 || Socorro || LINEAR || — || align=right | 1.2 km || 
|-id=060 bgcolor=#E9E9E9
| 254060 ||  || — || April 17, 2004 || Socorro || LINEAR || — || align=right | 2.0 km || 
|-id=061 bgcolor=#E9E9E9
| 254061 ||  || — || April 16, 2004 || Kitt Peak || Spacewatch || — || align=right | 3.0 km || 
|-id=062 bgcolor=#E9E9E9
| 254062 ||  || — || April 16, 2004 || Kitt Peak || Spacewatch || — || align=right | 1.3 km || 
|-id=063 bgcolor=#E9E9E9
| 254063 ||  || — || April 20, 2004 || Socorro || LINEAR || HEN || align=right | 1.6 km || 
|-id=064 bgcolor=#E9E9E9
| 254064 ||  || — || April 20, 2004 || Socorro || LINEAR || — || align=right | 3.0 km || 
|-id=065 bgcolor=#E9E9E9
| 254065 ||  || — || April 20, 2004 || Kitt Peak || Spacewatch || EUN || align=right | 1.5 km || 
|-id=066 bgcolor=#E9E9E9
| 254066 ||  || — || April 21, 2004 || Kitt Peak || Spacewatch || — || align=right | 4.0 km || 
|-id=067 bgcolor=#fefefe
| 254067 ||  || — || April 20, 2004 || Socorro || LINEAR || H || align=right | 1.0 km || 
|-id=068 bgcolor=#E9E9E9
| 254068 ||  || — || April 19, 2004 || Kitt Peak || Spacewatch || NEM || align=right | 2.7 km || 
|-id=069 bgcolor=#E9E9E9
| 254069 ||  || — || April 20, 2004 || Kitt Peak || Spacewatch || — || align=right | 1.1 km || 
|-id=070 bgcolor=#E9E9E9
| 254070 ||  || — || April 20, 2004 || Socorro || LINEAR || AER || align=right | 2.1 km || 
|-id=071 bgcolor=#E9E9E9
| 254071 ||  || — || April 20, 2004 || Socorro || LINEAR || EUN || align=right | 1.8 km || 
|-id=072 bgcolor=#E9E9E9
| 254072 ||  || — || April 23, 2004 || Siding Spring || SSS || — || align=right | 2.8 km || 
|-id=073 bgcolor=#fefefe
| 254073 ||  || — || April 24, 2004 || Kitt Peak || Spacewatch || H || align=right data-sort-value="0.69" | 690 m || 
|-id=074 bgcolor=#E9E9E9
| 254074 ||  || — || April 24, 2004 || Kitt Peak || Spacewatch || — || align=right | 1.7 km || 
|-id=075 bgcolor=#E9E9E9
| 254075 ||  || — || April 16, 2004 || Palomar || NEAT || HNS || align=right | 1.6 km || 
|-id=076 bgcolor=#E9E9E9
| 254076 ||  || — || April 17, 2004 || Palomar || NEAT || — || align=right | 3.8 km || 
|-id=077 bgcolor=#E9E9E9
| 254077 ||  || — || April 21, 2004 || Kitt Peak || Spacewatch || — || align=right | 2.3 km || 
|-id=078 bgcolor=#E9E9E9
| 254078 ||  || — || April 21, 2004 || Kitt Peak || Spacewatch || — || align=right | 2.9 km || 
|-id=079 bgcolor=#C2FFFF
| 254079 ||  || — || April 25, 2004 || Kitt Peak || Spacewatch || L4 || align=right | 13 km || 
|-id=080 bgcolor=#E9E9E9
| 254080 ||  || — || May 10, 2004 || Reedy Creek || J. Broughton || GER || align=right | 1.8 km || 
|-id=081 bgcolor=#E9E9E9
| 254081 ||  || — || May 9, 2004 || Kitt Peak || Spacewatch || — || align=right | 3.0 km || 
|-id=082 bgcolor=#d6d6d6
| 254082 ||  || — || May 9, 2004 || Kitt Peak || Spacewatch || — || align=right | 3.8 km || 
|-id=083 bgcolor=#E9E9E9
| 254083 ||  || — || May 9, 2004 || Kitt Peak || Spacewatch || — || align=right | 2.8 km || 
|-id=084 bgcolor=#E9E9E9
| 254084 ||  || — || May 9, 2004 || Kitt Peak || Spacewatch || — || align=right | 1.5 km || 
|-id=085 bgcolor=#d6d6d6
| 254085 ||  || — || May 12, 2004 || Catalina || CSS || — || align=right | 4.2 km || 
|-id=086 bgcolor=#E9E9E9
| 254086 ||  || — || May 13, 2004 || Palomar || NEAT || — || align=right | 1.5 km || 
|-id=087 bgcolor=#E9E9E9
| 254087 ||  || — || May 10, 2004 || Palomar || NEAT || — || align=right | 2.0 km || 
|-id=088 bgcolor=#E9E9E9
| 254088 ||  || — || May 13, 2004 || Palomar || NEAT || HNS || align=right | 2.0 km || 
|-id=089 bgcolor=#E9E9E9
| 254089 ||  || — || May 15, 2004 || Socorro || LINEAR || — || align=right | 2.1 km || 
|-id=090 bgcolor=#E9E9E9
| 254090 ||  || — || May 15, 2004 || Socorro || LINEAR || — || align=right | 2.2 km || 
|-id=091 bgcolor=#E9E9E9
| 254091 ||  || — || May 15, 2004 || Socorro || LINEAR || — || align=right | 2.3 km || 
|-id=092 bgcolor=#E9E9E9
| 254092 ||  || — || May 15, 2004 || Siding Spring || SSS || — || align=right | 1.9 km || 
|-id=093 bgcolor=#E9E9E9
| 254093 ||  || — || May 13, 2004 || Palomar || NEAT || — || align=right | 2.3 km || 
|-id=094 bgcolor=#E9E9E9
| 254094 ||  || — || May 15, 2004 || Socorro || LINEAR || — || align=right | 1.5 km || 
|-id=095 bgcolor=#E9E9E9
| 254095 ||  || — || May 13, 2004 || Kitt Peak || Spacewatch || — || align=right | 1.8 km || 
|-id=096 bgcolor=#E9E9E9
| 254096 ||  || — || May 16, 2004 || Reedy Creek || J. Broughton || ADE || align=right | 2.7 km || 
|-id=097 bgcolor=#E9E9E9
| 254097 ||  || — || May 16, 2004 || Reedy Creek || J. Broughton || — || align=right | 2.2 km || 
|-id=098 bgcolor=#E9E9E9
| 254098 ||  || — || May 18, 2004 || Socorro || LINEAR || — || align=right | 3.6 km || 
|-id=099 bgcolor=#E9E9E9
| 254099 ||  || — || May 18, 2004 || Socorro || LINEAR || — || align=right | 2.5 km || 
|-id=100 bgcolor=#E9E9E9
| 254100 ||  || — || May 21, 2004 || Socorro || LINEAR || — || align=right | 3.1 km || 
|}

254101–254200 

|-bgcolor=#d6d6d6
| 254101 ||  || — || May 27, 2004 || Kitt Peak || Spacewatch || — || align=right | 5.4 km || 
|-id=102 bgcolor=#d6d6d6
| 254102 ||  || — || May 27, 2004 || Kitt Peak || Spacewatch || — || align=right | 4.3 km || 
|-id=103 bgcolor=#fefefe
| 254103 ||  || — || June 6, 2004 || Palomar || NEAT || H || align=right data-sort-value="0.83" | 830 m || 
|-id=104 bgcolor=#E9E9E9
| 254104 ||  || — || June 14, 2004 || Reedy Creek || J. Broughton || — || align=right | 2.1 km || 
|-id=105 bgcolor=#d6d6d6
| 254105 ||  || — || June 14, 2004 || Catalina || CSS || — || align=right | 5.3 km || 
|-id=106 bgcolor=#E9E9E9
| 254106 ||  || — || June 11, 2004 || Kitt Peak || Spacewatch || — || align=right | 2.4 km || 
|-id=107 bgcolor=#fefefe
| 254107 ||  || — || June 13, 2004 || Kitt Peak || Spacewatch || H || align=right data-sort-value="0.80" | 800 m || 
|-id=108 bgcolor=#d6d6d6
| 254108 ||  || — || June 14, 2004 || Kitt Peak || Spacewatch || — || align=right | 3.8 km || 
|-id=109 bgcolor=#fefefe
| 254109 ||  || — || June 17, 2004 || Socorro || LINEAR || H || align=right | 1.0 km || 
|-id=110 bgcolor=#d6d6d6
| 254110 ||  || — || July 1, 2004 || Siding Spring || SSS || EUP || align=right | 4.0 km || 
|-id=111 bgcolor=#d6d6d6
| 254111 ||  || — || July 12, 2004 || Palomar || NEAT || EUP || align=right | 5.7 km || 
|-id=112 bgcolor=#d6d6d6
| 254112 ||  || — || July 9, 2004 || Palomar || NEAT || — || align=right | 5.0 km || 
|-id=113 bgcolor=#d6d6d6
| 254113 ||  || — || July 11, 2004 || Socorro || LINEAR || — || align=right | 2.9 km || 
|-id=114 bgcolor=#d6d6d6
| 254114 ||  || — || July 14, 2004 || Socorro || LINEAR || — || align=right | 5.0 km || 
|-id=115 bgcolor=#d6d6d6
| 254115 ||  || — || July 11, 2004 || Anderson Mesa || LONEOS || — || align=right | 4.1 km || 
|-id=116 bgcolor=#d6d6d6
| 254116 ||  || — || July 11, 2004 || Anderson Mesa || LONEOS || — || align=right | 6.7 km || 
|-id=117 bgcolor=#d6d6d6
| 254117 ||  || — || July 13, 2004 || Siding Spring || SSS || — || align=right | 4.7 km || 
|-id=118 bgcolor=#d6d6d6
| 254118 ||  || — || July 16, 2004 || Socorro || LINEAR || — || align=right | 4.4 km || 
|-id=119 bgcolor=#d6d6d6
| 254119 ||  || — || July 20, 2004 || Reedy Creek || J. Broughton || AEG || align=right | 4.2 km || 
|-id=120 bgcolor=#fefefe
| 254120 ||  || — || July 27, 2004 || Needville || Needville Obs. || — || align=right | 1.1 km || 
|-id=121 bgcolor=#d6d6d6
| 254121 ||  || — || July 16, 2004 || Campo Imperatore || CINEOS || — || align=right | 3.9 km || 
|-id=122 bgcolor=#d6d6d6
| 254122 ||  || — || July 21, 2004 || Siding Spring || SSS || — || align=right | 3.2 km || 
|-id=123 bgcolor=#d6d6d6
| 254123 ||  || — || August 6, 2004 || Reedy Creek || J. Broughton || EOS || align=right | 2.9 km || 
|-id=124 bgcolor=#d6d6d6
| 254124 ||  || — || August 3, 2004 || Siding Spring || SSS || — || align=right | 4.5 km || 
|-id=125 bgcolor=#d6d6d6
| 254125 ||  || — || August 6, 2004 || Campo Imperatore || CINEOS || — || align=right | 3.4 km || 
|-id=126 bgcolor=#d6d6d6
| 254126 ||  || — || August 7, 2004 || Palomar || NEAT || HYG || align=right | 4.5 km || 
|-id=127 bgcolor=#d6d6d6
| 254127 ||  || — || August 7, 2004 || Palomar || NEAT || — || align=right | 3.9 km || 
|-id=128 bgcolor=#d6d6d6
| 254128 ||  || — || August 7, 2004 || Palomar || NEAT || — || align=right | 4.6 km || 
|-id=129 bgcolor=#d6d6d6
| 254129 ||  || — || August 7, 2004 || Palomar || NEAT || — || align=right | 5.0 km || 
|-id=130 bgcolor=#d6d6d6
| 254130 ||  || — || August 7, 2004 || Palomar || NEAT || — || align=right | 5.7 km || 
|-id=131 bgcolor=#d6d6d6
| 254131 ||  || — || August 7, 2004 || Campo Imperatore || CINEOS || — || align=right | 4.2 km || 
|-id=132 bgcolor=#d6d6d6
| 254132 ||  || — || August 8, 2004 || Socorro || LINEAR || — || align=right | 5.6 km || 
|-id=133 bgcolor=#d6d6d6
| 254133 ||  || — || August 6, 2004 || Palomar || NEAT || — || align=right | 4.1 km || 
|-id=134 bgcolor=#d6d6d6
| 254134 ||  || — || August 9, 2004 || Socorro || LINEAR || EUP || align=right | 7.3 km || 
|-id=135 bgcolor=#d6d6d6
| 254135 ||  || — || August 6, 2004 || Palomar || NEAT || EOS || align=right | 2.8 km || 
|-id=136 bgcolor=#d6d6d6
| 254136 ||  || — || August 8, 2004 || Socorro || LINEAR || HYG || align=right | 3.4 km || 
|-id=137 bgcolor=#d6d6d6
| 254137 ||  || — || August 8, 2004 || Socorro || LINEAR || HYG || align=right | 3.3 km || 
|-id=138 bgcolor=#d6d6d6
| 254138 ||  || — || August 9, 2004 || Socorro || LINEAR || HYG || align=right | 3.6 km || 
|-id=139 bgcolor=#d6d6d6
| 254139 ||  || — || August 9, 2004 || Socorro || LINEAR || — || align=right | 3.5 km || 
|-id=140 bgcolor=#d6d6d6
| 254140 ||  || — || August 9, 2004 || Anderson Mesa || LONEOS || — || align=right | 4.0 km || 
|-id=141 bgcolor=#d6d6d6
| 254141 ||  || — || August 9, 2004 || Socorro || LINEAR || — || align=right | 6.2 km || 
|-id=142 bgcolor=#d6d6d6
| 254142 ||  || — || August 9, 2004 || Socorro || LINEAR || TIR || align=right | 4.1 km || 
|-id=143 bgcolor=#d6d6d6
| 254143 ||  || — || August 9, 2004 || Socorro || LINEAR || — || align=right | 4.3 km || 
|-id=144 bgcolor=#d6d6d6
| 254144 ||  || — || August 9, 2004 || Socorro || LINEAR || — || align=right | 3.0 km || 
|-id=145 bgcolor=#d6d6d6
| 254145 ||  || — || August 8, 2004 || Socorro || LINEAR || EOS || align=right | 3.0 km || 
|-id=146 bgcolor=#d6d6d6
| 254146 ||  || — || August 8, 2004 || Anderson Mesa || LONEOS || — || align=right | 5.0 km || 
|-id=147 bgcolor=#d6d6d6
| 254147 ||  || — || August 9, 2004 || Socorro || LINEAR || — || align=right | 3.2 km || 
|-id=148 bgcolor=#d6d6d6
| 254148 ||  || — || August 9, 2004 || Socorro || LINEAR || TEL || align=right | 2.2 km || 
|-id=149 bgcolor=#d6d6d6
| 254149 ||  || — || August 9, 2004 || Socorro || LINEAR || — || align=right | 5.7 km || 
|-id=150 bgcolor=#d6d6d6
| 254150 ||  || — || August 9, 2004 || Anderson Mesa || LONEOS || TIR || align=right | 4.2 km || 
|-id=151 bgcolor=#d6d6d6
| 254151 ||  || — || August 10, 2004 || Socorro || LINEAR || THM || align=right | 4.6 km || 
|-id=152 bgcolor=#d6d6d6
| 254152 ||  || — || August 10, 2004 || Socorro || LINEAR || — || align=right | 3.0 km || 
|-id=153 bgcolor=#d6d6d6
| 254153 ||  || — || August 11, 2004 || Socorro || LINEAR || — || align=right | 4.0 km || 
|-id=154 bgcolor=#d6d6d6
| 254154 ||  || — || August 11, 2004 || Socorro || LINEAR || — || align=right | 4.3 km || 
|-id=155 bgcolor=#d6d6d6
| 254155 ||  || — || August 11, 2004 || Socorro || LINEAR || THM || align=right | 3.1 km || 
|-id=156 bgcolor=#d6d6d6
| 254156 ||  || — || August 12, 2004 || Palomar || NEAT || — || align=right | 5.2 km || 
|-id=157 bgcolor=#d6d6d6
| 254157 ||  || — || August 11, 2004 || Wrightwood || J. W. Young || — || align=right | 4.0 km || 
|-id=158 bgcolor=#d6d6d6
| 254158 ||  || — || August 7, 2004 || Campo Imperatore || CINEOS || — || align=right | 3.0 km || 
|-id=159 bgcolor=#d6d6d6
| 254159 ||  || — || August 9, 2004 || Socorro || LINEAR || LIX || align=right | 6.4 km || 
|-id=160 bgcolor=#d6d6d6
| 254160 ||  || — || August 10, 2004 || Socorro || LINEAR || — || align=right | 5.4 km || 
|-id=161 bgcolor=#d6d6d6
| 254161 ||  || — || August 12, 2004 || Socorro || LINEAR || — || align=right | 4.4 km || 
|-id=162 bgcolor=#d6d6d6
| 254162 ||  || — || August 12, 2004 || Campo Imperatore || CINEOS || — || align=right | 4.5 km || 
|-id=163 bgcolor=#d6d6d6
| 254163 ||  || — || August 8, 2004 || Socorro || LINEAR || — || align=right | 4.2 km || 
|-id=164 bgcolor=#d6d6d6
| 254164 ||  || — || August 11, 2004 || Palomar || NEAT || — || align=right | 3.8 km || 
|-id=165 bgcolor=#d6d6d6
| 254165 ||  || — || August 19, 2004 || Reedy Creek || J. Broughton || — || align=right | 4.4 km || 
|-id=166 bgcolor=#d6d6d6
| 254166 ||  || — || August 20, 2004 || Wise || Wise Obs. || URS || align=right | 5.7 km || 
|-id=167 bgcolor=#d6d6d6
| 254167 ||  || — || August 16, 2004 || Siding Spring || SSS || THB || align=right | 3.1 km || 
|-id=168 bgcolor=#d6d6d6
| 254168 ||  || — || August 21, 2004 || Siding Spring || SSS || — || align=right | 4.9 km || 
|-id=169 bgcolor=#d6d6d6
| 254169 ||  || — || August 21, 2004 || Siding Spring || SSS || — || align=right | 3.1 km || 
|-id=170 bgcolor=#d6d6d6
| 254170 ||  || — || August 21, 2004 || Kvistaberg || UDAS || EUP || align=right | 6.0 km || 
|-id=171 bgcolor=#d6d6d6
| 254171 ||  || — || August 19, 2004 || Socorro || LINEAR || — || align=right | 5.6 km || 
|-id=172 bgcolor=#d6d6d6
| 254172 ||  || — || August 24, 2004 || Socorro || LINEAR || Tj (2.97) || align=right | 3.8 km || 
|-id=173 bgcolor=#d6d6d6
| 254173 ||  || — || September 4, 2004 || Needville || D. Borgman, J. Dellinger || — || align=right | 2.9 km || 
|-id=174 bgcolor=#d6d6d6
| 254174 ||  || — || September 6, 2004 || Socorro || LINEAR || EUP || align=right | 6.0 km || 
|-id=175 bgcolor=#d6d6d6
| 254175 ||  || — || September 4, 2004 || Palomar || NEAT || — || align=right | 5.3 km || 
|-id=176 bgcolor=#d6d6d6
| 254176 ||  || — || September 4, 2004 || Palomar || NEAT || — || align=right | 6.9 km || 
|-id=177 bgcolor=#d6d6d6
| 254177 ||  || — || September 5, 2004 || Palomar || NEAT || — || align=right | 5.1 km || 
|-id=178 bgcolor=#d6d6d6
| 254178 ||  || — || September 6, 2004 || Goodricke-Pigott || Goodricke-Pigott Obs. || — || align=right | 3.0 km || 
|-id=179 bgcolor=#d6d6d6
| 254179 ||  || — || September 3, 2004 || Anderson Mesa || LONEOS || — || align=right | 3.7 km || 
|-id=180 bgcolor=#d6d6d6
| 254180 ||  || — || September 7, 2004 || Socorro || LINEAR || — || align=right | 3.9 km || 
|-id=181 bgcolor=#d6d6d6
| 254181 ||  || — || September 7, 2004 || Socorro || LINEAR || HYG || align=right | 3.7 km || 
|-id=182 bgcolor=#d6d6d6
| 254182 ||  || — || September 7, 2004 || Kitt Peak || Spacewatch || EOS || align=right | 2.6 km || 
|-id=183 bgcolor=#d6d6d6
| 254183 ||  || — || September 7, 2004 || Kitt Peak || Spacewatch || HYG || align=right | 3.5 km || 
|-id=184 bgcolor=#d6d6d6
| 254184 ||  || — || September 7, 2004 || Kitt Peak || Spacewatch || — || align=right | 5.2 km || 
|-id=185 bgcolor=#d6d6d6
| 254185 ||  || — || September 7, 2004 || Kitt Peak || Spacewatch || — || align=right | 2.8 km || 
|-id=186 bgcolor=#d6d6d6
| 254186 ||  || — || September 6, 2004 || Palomar || NEAT || — || align=right | 3.8 km || 
|-id=187 bgcolor=#d6d6d6
| 254187 ||  || — || September 7, 2004 || Socorro || LINEAR || — || align=right | 5.8 km || 
|-id=188 bgcolor=#d6d6d6
| 254188 ||  || — || September 7, 2004 || Socorro || LINEAR || — || align=right | 4.5 km || 
|-id=189 bgcolor=#d6d6d6
| 254189 ||  || — || September 7, 2004 || Socorro || LINEAR || HYG || align=right | 3.4 km || 
|-id=190 bgcolor=#d6d6d6
| 254190 ||  || — || September 7, 2004 || Kitt Peak || Spacewatch || KOR || align=right | 2.4 km || 
|-id=191 bgcolor=#d6d6d6
| 254191 ||  || — || September 7, 2004 || Kitt Peak || Spacewatch || — || align=right | 5.0 km || 
|-id=192 bgcolor=#d6d6d6
| 254192 ||  || — || September 7, 2004 || Kitt Peak || Spacewatch || ANF || align=right | 2.1 km || 
|-id=193 bgcolor=#d6d6d6
| 254193 ||  || — || September 8, 2004 || Socorro || LINEAR || — || align=right | 4.3 km || 
|-id=194 bgcolor=#d6d6d6
| 254194 ||  || — || September 8, 2004 || Socorro || LINEAR || — || align=right | 5.0 km || 
|-id=195 bgcolor=#d6d6d6
| 254195 ||  || — || September 8, 2004 || Socorro || LINEAR || HYG || align=right | 3.3 km || 
|-id=196 bgcolor=#d6d6d6
| 254196 ||  || — || September 8, 2004 || Socorro || LINEAR || — || align=right | 4.9 km || 
|-id=197 bgcolor=#d6d6d6
| 254197 ||  || — || September 8, 2004 || Socorro || LINEAR || — || align=right | 3.7 km || 
|-id=198 bgcolor=#d6d6d6
| 254198 ||  || — || September 8, 2004 || Socorro || LINEAR || — || align=right | 3.4 km || 
|-id=199 bgcolor=#d6d6d6
| 254199 ||  || — || September 8, 2004 || Socorro || LINEAR || — || align=right | 4.8 km || 
|-id=200 bgcolor=#d6d6d6
| 254200 ||  || — || September 8, 2004 || Socorro || LINEAR || — || align=right | 4.6 km || 
|}

254201–254300 

|-bgcolor=#d6d6d6
| 254201 ||  || — || September 8, 2004 || Socorro || LINEAR || — || align=right | 4.3 km || 
|-id=202 bgcolor=#d6d6d6
| 254202 ||  || — || September 8, 2004 || Socorro || LINEAR || — || align=right | 3.4 km || 
|-id=203 bgcolor=#d6d6d6
| 254203 ||  || — || September 8, 2004 || Socorro || LINEAR || THM || align=right | 2.9 km || 
|-id=204 bgcolor=#d6d6d6
| 254204 ||  || — || September 8, 2004 || Socorro || LINEAR || — || align=right | 4.5 km || 
|-id=205 bgcolor=#d6d6d6
| 254205 ||  || — || September 8, 2004 || Socorro || LINEAR || — || align=right | 4.2 km || 
|-id=206 bgcolor=#d6d6d6
| 254206 ||  || — || September 8, 2004 || Socorro || LINEAR || — || align=right | 4.2 km || 
|-id=207 bgcolor=#d6d6d6
| 254207 ||  || — || September 7, 2004 || Socorro || LINEAR || — || align=right | 7.9 km || 
|-id=208 bgcolor=#d6d6d6
| 254208 ||  || — || September 7, 2004 || Palomar || NEAT || — || align=right | 4.0 km || 
|-id=209 bgcolor=#d6d6d6
| 254209 ||  || — || September 7, 2004 || Palomar || NEAT || — || align=right | 4.1 km || 
|-id=210 bgcolor=#d6d6d6
| 254210 ||  || — || September 8, 2004 || Socorro || LINEAR || EOS || align=right | 3.1 km || 
|-id=211 bgcolor=#d6d6d6
| 254211 ||  || — || September 8, 2004 || Socorro || LINEAR || — || align=right | 3.2 km || 
|-id=212 bgcolor=#d6d6d6
| 254212 ||  || — || September 8, 2004 || Socorro || LINEAR || URS || align=right | 4.5 km || 
|-id=213 bgcolor=#d6d6d6
| 254213 ||  || — || September 8, 2004 || Socorro || LINEAR || — || align=right | 4.5 km || 
|-id=214 bgcolor=#d6d6d6
| 254214 ||  || — || September 8, 2004 || Socorro || LINEAR || — || align=right | 4.7 km || 
|-id=215 bgcolor=#d6d6d6
| 254215 ||  || — || September 8, 2004 || Socorro || LINEAR || — || align=right | 4.8 km || 
|-id=216 bgcolor=#d6d6d6
| 254216 ||  || — || September 8, 2004 || Socorro || LINEAR || EOS || align=right | 3.4 km || 
|-id=217 bgcolor=#d6d6d6
| 254217 ||  || — || September 8, 2004 || Socorro || LINEAR || — || align=right | 4.6 km || 
|-id=218 bgcolor=#d6d6d6
| 254218 ||  || — || September 8, 2004 || Socorro || LINEAR || EOS || align=right | 2.9 km || 
|-id=219 bgcolor=#d6d6d6
| 254219 ||  || — || September 8, 2004 || Socorro || LINEAR || — || align=right | 4.5 km || 
|-id=220 bgcolor=#d6d6d6
| 254220 ||  || — || September 8, 2004 || Socorro || LINEAR || EOS || align=right | 2.8 km || 
|-id=221 bgcolor=#d6d6d6
| 254221 ||  || — || September 8, 2004 || Socorro || LINEAR || — || align=right | 4.4 km || 
|-id=222 bgcolor=#d6d6d6
| 254222 ||  || — || September 8, 2004 || Socorro || LINEAR || — || align=right | 4.2 km || 
|-id=223 bgcolor=#d6d6d6
| 254223 ||  || — || September 8, 2004 || Palomar || NEAT || TEL || align=right | 2.0 km || 
|-id=224 bgcolor=#d6d6d6
| 254224 ||  || — || September 8, 2004 || Palomar || NEAT || EOS || align=right | 3.1 km || 
|-id=225 bgcolor=#d6d6d6
| 254225 ||  || — || September 8, 2004 || Socorro || LINEAR || — || align=right | 4.0 km || 
|-id=226 bgcolor=#d6d6d6
| 254226 ||  || — || September 8, 2004 || Palomar || NEAT || EOS || align=right | 3.5 km || 
|-id=227 bgcolor=#d6d6d6
| 254227 ||  || — || September 8, 2004 || Palomar || NEAT || — || align=right | 4.6 km || 
|-id=228 bgcolor=#d6d6d6
| 254228 ||  || — || September 7, 2004 || Socorro || LINEAR || — || align=right | 3.3 km || 
|-id=229 bgcolor=#d6d6d6
| 254229 ||  || — || September 7, 2004 || Socorro || LINEAR || — || align=right | 3.5 km || 
|-id=230 bgcolor=#d6d6d6
| 254230 ||  || — || September 7, 2004 || Socorro || LINEAR || — || align=right | 6.4 km || 
|-id=231 bgcolor=#d6d6d6
| 254231 ||  || — || September 7, 2004 || Kitt Peak || Spacewatch || — || align=right | 2.8 km || 
|-id=232 bgcolor=#d6d6d6
| 254232 ||  || — || September 7, 2004 || Kitt Peak || Spacewatch || — || align=right | 3.3 km || 
|-id=233 bgcolor=#d6d6d6
| 254233 ||  || — || September 7, 2004 || Kitt Peak || Spacewatch || — || align=right | 2.9 km || 
|-id=234 bgcolor=#d6d6d6
| 254234 ||  || — || September 7, 2004 || Kitt Peak || Spacewatch || — || align=right | 3.9 km || 
|-id=235 bgcolor=#d6d6d6
| 254235 ||  || — || September 7, 2004 || Kitt Peak || Spacewatch || THM || align=right | 4.2 km || 
|-id=236 bgcolor=#d6d6d6
| 254236 ||  || — || September 7, 2004 || Kitt Peak || Spacewatch || 637 || align=right | 3.1 km || 
|-id=237 bgcolor=#d6d6d6
| 254237 ||  || — || September 7, 2004 || Kitt Peak || Spacewatch || THM || align=right | 2.7 km || 
|-id=238 bgcolor=#fefefe
| 254238 ||  || — || September 8, 2004 || Socorro || LINEAR || H || align=right | 1.1 km || 
|-id=239 bgcolor=#d6d6d6
| 254239 ||  || — || September 8, 2004 || Socorro || LINEAR || HYG || align=right | 4.3 km || 
|-id=240 bgcolor=#d6d6d6
| 254240 ||  || — || September 8, 2004 || Socorro || LINEAR || EOS || align=right | 2.3 km || 
|-id=241 bgcolor=#d6d6d6
| 254241 ||  || — || September 8, 2004 || Socorro || LINEAR || — || align=right | 5.0 km || 
|-id=242 bgcolor=#d6d6d6
| 254242 ||  || — || September 8, 2004 || Palomar || NEAT || — || align=right | 4.6 km || 
|-id=243 bgcolor=#d6d6d6
| 254243 ||  || — || September 8, 2004 || Socorro || LINEAR || — || align=right | 5.2 km || 
|-id=244 bgcolor=#d6d6d6
| 254244 ||  || — || September 9, 2004 || Socorro || LINEAR || — || align=right | 4.7 km || 
|-id=245 bgcolor=#d6d6d6
| 254245 ||  || — || September 9, 2004 || Socorro || LINEAR || ALA || align=right | 6.2 km || 
|-id=246 bgcolor=#d6d6d6
| 254246 ||  || — || September 10, 2004 || Socorro || LINEAR || MEL || align=right | 5.4 km || 
|-id=247 bgcolor=#d6d6d6
| 254247 ||  || — || September 10, 2004 || Socorro || LINEAR || — || align=right | 5.2 km || 
|-id=248 bgcolor=#d6d6d6
| 254248 ||  || — || September 10, 2004 || Socorro || LINEAR || EOS || align=right | 3.1 km || 
|-id=249 bgcolor=#d6d6d6
| 254249 ||  || — || September 10, 2004 || Socorro || LINEAR || — || align=right | 4.9 km || 
|-id=250 bgcolor=#d6d6d6
| 254250 ||  || — || September 10, 2004 || Socorro || LINEAR || — || align=right | 4.2 km || 
|-id=251 bgcolor=#d6d6d6
| 254251 ||  || — || September 11, 2004 || Socorro || LINEAR || — || align=right | 4.5 km || 
|-id=252 bgcolor=#d6d6d6
| 254252 ||  || — || September 11, 2004 || Socorro || LINEAR || — || align=right | 4.5 km || 
|-id=253 bgcolor=#d6d6d6
| 254253 ||  || — || September 12, 2004 || Socorro || LINEAR || ALA || align=right | 5.0 km || 
|-id=254 bgcolor=#d6d6d6
| 254254 ||  || — || September 7, 2004 || Socorro || LINEAR || HYG || align=right | 3.3 km || 
|-id=255 bgcolor=#d6d6d6
| 254255 ||  || — || September 8, 2004 || Socorro || LINEAR || EUP || align=right | 5.1 km || 
|-id=256 bgcolor=#d6d6d6
| 254256 ||  || — || September 8, 2004 || Socorro || LINEAR || EOS || align=right | 3.2 km || 
|-id=257 bgcolor=#d6d6d6
| 254257 ||  || — || September 8, 2004 || Palomar || NEAT || LIX || align=right | 4.8 km || 
|-id=258 bgcolor=#d6d6d6
| 254258 ||  || — || September 9, 2004 || Socorro || LINEAR || — || align=right | 4.7 km || 
|-id=259 bgcolor=#d6d6d6
| 254259 ||  || — || September 9, 2004 || Socorro || LINEAR || — || align=right | 5.3 km || 
|-id=260 bgcolor=#d6d6d6
| 254260 ||  || — || September 10, 2004 || Socorro || LINEAR || — || align=right | 4.0 km || 
|-id=261 bgcolor=#d6d6d6
| 254261 ||  || — || September 10, 2004 || Socorro || LINEAR || EOS || align=right | 3.0 km || 
|-id=262 bgcolor=#d6d6d6
| 254262 ||  || — || September 10, 2004 || Socorro || LINEAR || — || align=right | 2.9 km || 
|-id=263 bgcolor=#d6d6d6
| 254263 ||  || — || September 10, 2004 || Socorro || LINEAR || EOS || align=right | 3.1 km || 
|-id=264 bgcolor=#d6d6d6
| 254264 ||  || — || September 10, 2004 || Socorro || LINEAR || — || align=right | 5.1 km || 
|-id=265 bgcolor=#d6d6d6
| 254265 ||  || — || September 10, 2004 || Socorro || LINEAR || HYG || align=right | 4.0 km || 
|-id=266 bgcolor=#d6d6d6
| 254266 ||  || — || September 10, 2004 || Socorro || LINEAR || CRO || align=right | 6.2 km || 
|-id=267 bgcolor=#d6d6d6
| 254267 ||  || — || September 10, 2004 || Socorro || LINEAR || EOS || align=right | 2.6 km || 
|-id=268 bgcolor=#d6d6d6
| 254268 ||  || — || September 10, 2004 || Socorro || LINEAR || EOS || align=right | 3.4 km || 
|-id=269 bgcolor=#d6d6d6
| 254269 ||  || — || September 10, 2004 || Socorro || LINEAR || — || align=right | 4.9 km || 
|-id=270 bgcolor=#d6d6d6
| 254270 ||  || — || September 10, 2004 || Socorro || LINEAR || — || align=right | 4.4 km || 
|-id=271 bgcolor=#d6d6d6
| 254271 ||  || — || September 10, 2004 || Socorro || LINEAR || — || align=right | 4.3 km || 
|-id=272 bgcolor=#d6d6d6
| 254272 ||  || — || September 10, 2004 || Socorro || LINEAR || — || align=right | 4.2 km || 
|-id=273 bgcolor=#d6d6d6
| 254273 ||  || — || September 10, 2004 || Socorro || LINEAR || EOS || align=right | 2.9 km || 
|-id=274 bgcolor=#d6d6d6
| 254274 ||  || — || September 10, 2004 || Socorro || LINEAR || EOS || align=right | 2.4 km || 
|-id=275 bgcolor=#d6d6d6
| 254275 ||  || — || September 10, 2004 || Kitt Peak || Spacewatch || — || align=right | 2.7 km || 
|-id=276 bgcolor=#d6d6d6
| 254276 ||  || — || September 11, 2004 || Socorro || LINEAR || — || align=right | 3.9 km || 
|-id=277 bgcolor=#d6d6d6
| 254277 ||  || — || September 7, 2004 || Palomar || NEAT || — || align=right | 4.8 km || 
|-id=278 bgcolor=#d6d6d6
| 254278 ||  || — || September 11, 2004 || Socorro || LINEAR || — || align=right | 5.1 km || 
|-id=279 bgcolor=#d6d6d6
| 254279 ||  || — || September 11, 2004 || Socorro || LINEAR || — || align=right | 5.2 km || 
|-id=280 bgcolor=#d6d6d6
| 254280 ||  || — || September 11, 2004 || Socorro || LINEAR || — || align=right | 4.5 km || 
|-id=281 bgcolor=#d6d6d6
| 254281 ||  || — || September 11, 2004 || Socorro || LINEAR || — || align=right | 3.5 km || 
|-id=282 bgcolor=#d6d6d6
| 254282 ||  || — || September 11, 2004 || Socorro || LINEAR || — || align=right | 4.3 km || 
|-id=283 bgcolor=#d6d6d6
| 254283 ||  || — || September 11, 2004 || Socorro || LINEAR || MEL || align=right | 5.8 km || 
|-id=284 bgcolor=#d6d6d6
| 254284 ||  || — || September 11, 2004 || Socorro || LINEAR || — || align=right | 7.3 km || 
|-id=285 bgcolor=#d6d6d6
| 254285 ||  || — || September 11, 2004 || Socorro || LINEAR || — || align=right | 5.6 km || 
|-id=286 bgcolor=#d6d6d6
| 254286 ||  || — || September 11, 2004 || Socorro || LINEAR || — || align=right | 4.6 km || 
|-id=287 bgcolor=#d6d6d6
| 254287 ||  || — || September 9, 2004 || Socorro || LINEAR || HYG || align=right | 3.5 km || 
|-id=288 bgcolor=#d6d6d6
| 254288 ||  || — || September 10, 2004 || Socorro || LINEAR || — || align=right | 3.9 km || 
|-id=289 bgcolor=#d6d6d6
| 254289 ||  || — || September 10, 2004 || Kitt Peak || Spacewatch || — || align=right | 3.6 km || 
|-id=290 bgcolor=#d6d6d6
| 254290 ||  || — || September 10, 2004 || Kitt Peak || Spacewatch || HYG || align=right | 4.3 km || 
|-id=291 bgcolor=#d6d6d6
| 254291 ||  || — || September 6, 2004 || Palomar || NEAT || — || align=right | 4.9 km || 
|-id=292 bgcolor=#d6d6d6
| 254292 ||  || — || September 9, 2004 || Socorro || LINEAR || THM || align=right | 3.1 km || 
|-id=293 bgcolor=#d6d6d6
| 254293 ||  || — || September 10, 2004 || Kitt Peak || Spacewatch || — || align=right | 3.1 km || 
|-id=294 bgcolor=#d6d6d6
| 254294 ||  || — || September 11, 2004 || Kitt Peak || Spacewatch || VER || align=right | 4.0 km || 
|-id=295 bgcolor=#d6d6d6
| 254295 ||  || — || September 11, 2004 || Kitt Peak || Spacewatch || — || align=right | 3.2 km || 
|-id=296 bgcolor=#d6d6d6
| 254296 ||  || — || September 11, 2004 || Kitt Peak || Spacewatch || HYG || align=right | 3.1 km || 
|-id=297 bgcolor=#d6d6d6
| 254297 ||  || — || September 15, 2004 || Kitt Peak || Spacewatch || 7:4 || align=right | 6.2 km || 
|-id=298 bgcolor=#d6d6d6
| 254298 ||  || — || September 15, 2004 || Socorro || LINEAR || — || align=right | 4.2 km || 
|-id=299 bgcolor=#d6d6d6
| 254299 Shambleau ||  ||  || September 15, 2004 || Saint-Sulpice || B. Christophe || — || align=right | 2.7 km || 
|-id=300 bgcolor=#d6d6d6
| 254300 ||  || — || September 3, 2004 || Siding Spring || SSS || TIR || align=right | 4.7 km || 
|}

254301–254400 

|-bgcolor=#d6d6d6
| 254301 ||  || — || September 10, 2004 || Socorro || LINEAR || — || align=right | 4.7 km || 
|-id=302 bgcolor=#d6d6d6
| 254302 ||  || — || September 11, 2004 || Kitt Peak || Spacewatch || — || align=right | 6.0 km || 
|-id=303 bgcolor=#d6d6d6
| 254303 ||  || — || September 11, 2004 || Socorro || LINEAR || THB || align=right | 4.4 km || 
|-id=304 bgcolor=#d6d6d6
| 254304 ||  || — || September 11, 2004 || Kitt Peak || Spacewatch || — || align=right | 2.6 km || 
|-id=305 bgcolor=#d6d6d6
| 254305 ||  || — || September 11, 2004 || Kitt Peak || Spacewatch || — || align=right | 4.1 km || 
|-id=306 bgcolor=#d6d6d6
| 254306 ||  || — || September 12, 2004 || Socorro || LINEAR || HYG || align=right | 4.1 km || 
|-id=307 bgcolor=#d6d6d6
| 254307 ||  || — || September 13, 2004 || Socorro || LINEAR || — || align=right | 4.3 km || 
|-id=308 bgcolor=#d6d6d6
| 254308 ||  || — || September 14, 2004 || Socorro || LINEAR || — || align=right | 4.3 km || 
|-id=309 bgcolor=#d6d6d6
| 254309 ||  || — || September 15, 2004 || Kitt Peak || Spacewatch || EOS || align=right | 2.3 km || 
|-id=310 bgcolor=#d6d6d6
| 254310 ||  || — || September 15, 2004 || Siding Spring || SSS || — || align=right | 5.8 km || 
|-id=311 bgcolor=#d6d6d6
| 254311 ||  || — || September 12, 2004 || Kitt Peak || Spacewatch || — || align=right | 3.4 km || 
|-id=312 bgcolor=#d6d6d6
| 254312 ||  || — || September 12, 2004 || Kitt Peak || Spacewatch || — || align=right | 3.5 km || 
|-id=313 bgcolor=#d6d6d6
| 254313 ||  || — || September 13, 2004 || Socorro || LINEAR || — || align=right | 4.4 km || 
|-id=314 bgcolor=#d6d6d6
| 254314 ||  || — || September 13, 2004 || Socorro || LINEAR || — || align=right | 5.5 km || 
|-id=315 bgcolor=#d6d6d6
| 254315 ||  || — || September 13, 2004 || Socorro || LINEAR || — || align=right | 4.8 km || 
|-id=316 bgcolor=#d6d6d6
| 254316 ||  || — || September 13, 2004 || Socorro || LINEAR || — || align=right | 4.3 km || 
|-id=317 bgcolor=#d6d6d6
| 254317 ||  || — || September 13, 2004 || Socorro || LINEAR || — || align=right | 4.8 km || 
|-id=318 bgcolor=#d6d6d6
| 254318 ||  || — || September 15, 2004 || Anderson Mesa || LONEOS || HYG || align=right | 3.7 km || 
|-id=319 bgcolor=#d6d6d6
| 254319 ||  || — || September 7, 2004 || Socorro || LINEAR || EUP || align=right | 6.6 km || 
|-id=320 bgcolor=#d6d6d6
| 254320 ||  || — || September 10, 2004 || Socorro || LINEAR || — || align=right | 4.3 km || 
|-id=321 bgcolor=#d6d6d6
| 254321 ||  || — || September 14, 2004 || Socorro || LINEAR || — || align=right | 4.0 km || 
|-id=322 bgcolor=#d6d6d6
| 254322 ||  || — || September 13, 2004 || Anderson Mesa || LONEOS || — || align=right | 4.3 km || 
|-id=323 bgcolor=#d6d6d6
| 254323 ||  || — || September 16, 2004 || Kitt Peak || Spacewatch || THM || align=right | 3.2 km || 
|-id=324 bgcolor=#d6d6d6
| 254324 ||  || — || September 17, 2004 || Socorro || LINEAR || — || align=right | 4.1 km || 
|-id=325 bgcolor=#d6d6d6
| 254325 ||  || — || September 17, 2004 || Socorro || LINEAR || — || align=right | 3.9 km || 
|-id=326 bgcolor=#d6d6d6
| 254326 ||  || — || September 17, 2004 || Kitt Peak || Spacewatch || CRO || align=right | 5.0 km || 
|-id=327 bgcolor=#d6d6d6
| 254327 ||  || — || September 16, 2004 || Siding Spring || SSS || — || align=right | 6.6 km || 
|-id=328 bgcolor=#d6d6d6
| 254328 ||  || — || September 21, 2004 || Kitt Peak || Spacewatch || — || align=right | 3.1 km || 
|-id=329 bgcolor=#d6d6d6
| 254329 ||  || — || September 17, 2004 || Socorro || LINEAR || — || align=right | 4.1 km || 
|-id=330 bgcolor=#d6d6d6
| 254330 ||  || — || September 17, 2004 || Socorro || LINEAR || — || align=right | 4.8 km || 
|-id=331 bgcolor=#d6d6d6
| 254331 ||  || — || September 17, 2004 || Socorro || LINEAR || — || align=right | 4.7 km || 
|-id=332 bgcolor=#d6d6d6
| 254332 ||  || — || September 17, 2004 || Socorro || LINEAR || — || align=right | 4.1 km || 
|-id=333 bgcolor=#d6d6d6
| 254333 ||  || — || September 17, 2004 || Kitt Peak || Spacewatch || — || align=right | 5.0 km || 
|-id=334 bgcolor=#d6d6d6
| 254334 ||  || — || September 17, 2004 || Kitt Peak || Spacewatch || — || align=right | 3.5 km || 
|-id=335 bgcolor=#d6d6d6
| 254335 ||  || — || September 17, 2004 || Socorro || LINEAR || HYG || align=right | 5.4 km || 
|-id=336 bgcolor=#d6d6d6
| 254336 ||  || — || September 18, 2004 || Socorro || LINEAR || URS || align=right | 4.9 km || 
|-id=337 bgcolor=#d6d6d6
| 254337 ||  || — || September 18, 2004 || Socorro || LINEAR || — || align=right | 4.5 km || 
|-id=338 bgcolor=#d6d6d6
| 254338 ||  || — || September 18, 2004 || Socorro || LINEAR || THB || align=right | 5.1 km || 
|-id=339 bgcolor=#d6d6d6
| 254339 ||  || — || September 18, 2004 || Socorro || LINEAR || THB || align=right | 4.4 km || 
|-id=340 bgcolor=#d6d6d6
| 254340 ||  || — || September 18, 2004 || Socorro || LINEAR || — || align=right | 4.8 km || 
|-id=341 bgcolor=#d6d6d6
| 254341 ||  || — || September 21, 2004 || Socorro || LINEAR || VER || align=right | 4.3 km || 
|-id=342 bgcolor=#d6d6d6
| 254342 ||  || — || September 22, 2004 || Socorro || LINEAR || EUP || align=right | 4.1 km || 
|-id=343 bgcolor=#d6d6d6
| 254343 ||  || — || September 16, 2004 || Anderson Mesa || LONEOS || Tj (2.99) || align=right | 6.0 km || 
|-id=344 bgcolor=#d6d6d6
| 254344 ||  || — || October 4, 2004 || Socorro || LINEAR || EUP || align=right | 7.7 km || 
|-id=345 bgcolor=#d6d6d6
| 254345 ||  || — || October 6, 2004 || Socorro || LINEAR || EUP || align=right | 9.8 km || 
|-id=346 bgcolor=#d6d6d6
| 254346 ||  || — || October 13, 2004 || Goodricke-Pigott || R. A. Tucker || EOS || align=right | 2.8 km || 
|-id=347 bgcolor=#d6d6d6
| 254347 ||  || — || October 4, 2004 || Kitt Peak || Spacewatch || — || align=right | 4.5 km || 
|-id=348 bgcolor=#d6d6d6
| 254348 ||  || — || October 4, 2004 || Kitt Peak || Spacewatch || — || align=right | 4.1 km || 
|-id=349 bgcolor=#d6d6d6
| 254349 ||  || — || October 4, 2004 || Kitt Peak || Spacewatch || THM || align=right | 3.6 km || 
|-id=350 bgcolor=#d6d6d6
| 254350 ||  || — || October 4, 2004 || Kitt Peak || Spacewatch || — || align=right | 3.7 km || 
|-id=351 bgcolor=#d6d6d6
| 254351 ||  || — || October 4, 2004 || Kitt Peak || Spacewatch || — || align=right | 4.0 km || 
|-id=352 bgcolor=#d6d6d6
| 254352 ||  || — || October 4, 2004 || Kitt Peak || Spacewatch || — || align=right | 4.9 km || 
|-id=353 bgcolor=#d6d6d6
| 254353 ||  || — || October 4, 2004 || Kitt Peak || Spacewatch || THM || align=right | 2.6 km || 
|-id=354 bgcolor=#d6d6d6
| 254354 ||  || — || October 4, 2004 || Kitt Peak || Spacewatch || — || align=right | 5.8 km || 
|-id=355 bgcolor=#d6d6d6
| 254355 ||  || — || October 5, 2004 || Anderson Mesa || LONEOS || — || align=right | 3.8 km || 
|-id=356 bgcolor=#d6d6d6
| 254356 ||  || — || October 5, 2004 || Anderson Mesa || LONEOS || — || align=right | 4.2 km || 
|-id=357 bgcolor=#d6d6d6
| 254357 ||  || — || October 5, 2004 || Kitt Peak || Spacewatch || — || align=right | 3.8 km || 
|-id=358 bgcolor=#d6d6d6
| 254358 ||  || — || October 5, 2004 || Kitt Peak || Spacewatch || THM || align=right | 3.2 km || 
|-id=359 bgcolor=#d6d6d6
| 254359 ||  || — || October 5, 2004 || Anderson Mesa || LONEOS || — || align=right | 3.6 km || 
|-id=360 bgcolor=#d6d6d6
| 254360 ||  || — || October 6, 2004 || Kitt Peak || Spacewatch || — || align=right | 2.7 km || 
|-id=361 bgcolor=#d6d6d6
| 254361 ||  || — || October 6, 2004 || Kitt Peak || Spacewatch || — || align=right | 4.5 km || 
|-id=362 bgcolor=#d6d6d6
| 254362 ||  || — || October 5, 2004 || Kitt Peak || Spacewatch || — || align=right | 4.1 km || 
|-id=363 bgcolor=#d6d6d6
| 254363 ||  || — || October 5, 2004 || Kitt Peak || Spacewatch || — || align=right | 4.0 km || 
|-id=364 bgcolor=#d6d6d6
| 254364 ||  || — || October 5, 2004 || Anderson Mesa || LONEOS || — || align=right | 2.4 km || 
|-id=365 bgcolor=#d6d6d6
| 254365 ||  || — || October 5, 2004 || Kitt Peak || Spacewatch || VER || align=right | 3.3 km || 
|-id=366 bgcolor=#d6d6d6
| 254366 ||  || — || October 5, 2004 || Kitt Peak || Spacewatch || THM || align=right | 2.3 km || 
|-id=367 bgcolor=#d6d6d6
| 254367 ||  || — || October 6, 2004 || Palomar || NEAT || 7:4 || align=right | 5.3 km || 
|-id=368 bgcolor=#d6d6d6
| 254368 ||  || — || October 4, 2004 || Kitt Peak || Spacewatch || — || align=right | 4.4 km || 
|-id=369 bgcolor=#d6d6d6
| 254369 ||  || — || October 4, 2004 || Apache Point || Apache Point Obs. || — || align=right | 4.9 km || 
|-id=370 bgcolor=#d6d6d6
| 254370 ||  || — || October 6, 2004 || Socorro || LINEAR || — || align=right | 5.9 km || 
|-id=371 bgcolor=#d6d6d6
| 254371 ||  || — || October 7, 2004 || Anderson Mesa || LONEOS || — || align=right | 4.4 km || 
|-id=372 bgcolor=#d6d6d6
| 254372 ||  || — || October 7, 2004 || Socorro || LINEAR || — || align=right | 6.1 km || 
|-id=373 bgcolor=#d6d6d6
| 254373 ||  || — || October 7, 2004 || Socorro || LINEAR || ALA || align=right | 4.8 km || 
|-id=374 bgcolor=#d6d6d6
| 254374 ||  || — || October 7, 2004 || Socorro || LINEAR || — || align=right | 3.5 km || 
|-id=375 bgcolor=#d6d6d6
| 254375 ||  || — || October 8, 2004 || Anderson Mesa || LONEOS || URS || align=right | 4.6 km || 
|-id=376 bgcolor=#d6d6d6
| 254376 ||  || — || October 8, 2004 || Anderson Mesa || LONEOS || — || align=right | 4.9 km || 
|-id=377 bgcolor=#d6d6d6
| 254377 ||  || — || October 8, 2004 || Anderson Mesa || LONEOS || — || align=right | 5.2 km || 
|-id=378 bgcolor=#d6d6d6
| 254378 ||  || — || October 6, 2004 || Kitt Peak || Spacewatch || HYG || align=right | 3.5 km || 
|-id=379 bgcolor=#d6d6d6
| 254379 ||  || — || October 6, 2004 || Kitt Peak || Spacewatch || — || align=right | 5.7 km || 
|-id=380 bgcolor=#d6d6d6
| 254380 ||  || — || October 6, 2004 || Kitt Peak || Spacewatch || — || align=right | 3.9 km || 
|-id=381 bgcolor=#d6d6d6
| 254381 ||  || — || October 6, 2004 || Kitt Peak || Spacewatch || — || align=right | 5.7 km || 
|-id=382 bgcolor=#d6d6d6
| 254382 ||  || — || October 7, 2004 || Socorro || LINEAR || — || align=right | 5.0 km || 
|-id=383 bgcolor=#d6d6d6
| 254383 ||  || — || October 7, 2004 || Kitt Peak || Spacewatch || — || align=right | 4.1 km || 
|-id=384 bgcolor=#d6d6d6
| 254384 ||  || — || October 7, 2004 || Kitt Peak || Spacewatch || — || align=right | 2.6 km || 
|-id=385 bgcolor=#d6d6d6
| 254385 ||  || — || October 7, 2004 || Kitt Peak || Spacewatch || — || align=right | 3.3 km || 
|-id=386 bgcolor=#d6d6d6
| 254386 ||  || — || October 8, 2004 || Kitt Peak || Spacewatch || — || align=right | 4.0 km || 
|-id=387 bgcolor=#d6d6d6
| 254387 ||  || — || October 8, 2004 || Kitt Peak || Spacewatch || HYG || align=right | 3.8 km || 
|-id=388 bgcolor=#d6d6d6
| 254388 ||  || — || October 8, 2004 || Kitt Peak || Spacewatch || — || align=right | 2.9 km || 
|-id=389 bgcolor=#d6d6d6
| 254389 ||  || — || October 8, 2004 || Kitt Peak || Spacewatch || THM || align=right | 2.9 km || 
|-id=390 bgcolor=#d6d6d6
| 254390 ||  || — || October 6, 2004 || Socorro || LINEAR || EOS || align=right | 3.7 km || 
|-id=391 bgcolor=#d6d6d6
| 254391 ||  || — || October 7, 2004 || Palomar || NEAT || VER || align=right | 3.7 km || 
|-id=392 bgcolor=#d6d6d6
| 254392 ||  || — || October 7, 2004 || Socorro || LINEAR || EUP || align=right | 5.4 km || 
|-id=393 bgcolor=#d6d6d6
| 254393 ||  || — || October 7, 2004 || Socorro || LINEAR || — || align=right | 5.0 km || 
|-id=394 bgcolor=#d6d6d6
| 254394 ||  || — || October 7, 2004 || Socorro || LINEAR || — || align=right | 6.7 km || 
|-id=395 bgcolor=#d6d6d6
| 254395 ||  || — || October 8, 2004 || Kitt Peak || Spacewatch || — || align=right | 3.9 km || 
|-id=396 bgcolor=#d6d6d6
| 254396 ||  || — || October 8, 2004 || Socorro || LINEAR || ALA || align=right | 6.2 km || 
|-id=397 bgcolor=#d6d6d6
| 254397 ||  || — || October 8, 2004 || Kitt Peak || Spacewatch || — || align=right | 4.4 km || 
|-id=398 bgcolor=#d6d6d6
| 254398 ||  || — || October 10, 2004 || Socorro || LINEAR || NAE || align=right | 4.1 km || 
|-id=399 bgcolor=#d6d6d6
| 254399 ||  || — || October 10, 2004 || Socorro || LINEAR || — || align=right | 5.3 km || 
|-id=400 bgcolor=#fefefe
| 254400 ||  || — || October 7, 2004 || Kitt Peak || Spacewatch || V || align=right | 1.0 km || 
|}

254401–254500 

|-bgcolor=#d6d6d6
| 254401 ||  || — || October 9, 2004 || Kitt Peak || Spacewatch || — || align=right | 4.5 km || 
|-id=402 bgcolor=#d6d6d6
| 254402 ||  || — || October 10, 2004 || Kitt Peak || Spacewatch || — || align=right | 3.0 km || 
|-id=403 bgcolor=#d6d6d6
| 254403 ||  || — || October 10, 2004 || Socorro || LINEAR || — || align=right | 4.8 km || 
|-id=404 bgcolor=#d6d6d6
| 254404 ||  || — || October 11, 2004 || Palomar || NEAT || — || align=right | 5.2 km || 
|-id=405 bgcolor=#d6d6d6
| 254405 ||  || — || October 8, 2004 || Anderson Mesa || LONEOS || — || align=right | 6.9 km || 
|-id=406 bgcolor=#d6d6d6
| 254406 ||  || — || October 11, 2004 || Kitt Peak || Spacewatch || — || align=right | 4.9 km || 
|-id=407 bgcolor=#d6d6d6
| 254407 ||  || — || October 12, 2004 || Kitt Peak || Spacewatch || — || align=right | 4.8 km || 
|-id=408 bgcolor=#d6d6d6
| 254408 ||  || — || October 9, 2004 || Kitt Peak || Spacewatch || HYG || align=right | 4.0 km || 
|-id=409 bgcolor=#d6d6d6
| 254409 ||  || — || October 13, 2004 || Kitt Peak || Spacewatch || — || align=right | 4.4 km || 
|-id=410 bgcolor=#d6d6d6
| 254410 ||  || — || October 14, 2004 || Anderson Mesa || LONEOS || — || align=right | 4.7 km || 
|-id=411 bgcolor=#d6d6d6
| 254411 ||  || — || October 10, 2004 || Socorro || LINEAR || — || align=right | 4.8 km || 
|-id=412 bgcolor=#d6d6d6
| 254412 ||  || — || October 18, 2004 || Socorro || LINEAR || — || align=right | 4.7 km || 
|-id=413 bgcolor=#d6d6d6
| 254413 ||  || — || October 16, 2004 || Socorro || LINEAR || EUP || align=right | 7.3 km || 
|-id=414 bgcolor=#d6d6d6
| 254414 ||  || — || October 16, 2004 || Socorro || LINEAR || EUP || align=right | 7.1 km || 
|-id=415 bgcolor=#d6d6d6
| 254415 ||  || — || October 21, 2004 || Socorro || LINEAR || — || align=right | 7.7 km || 
|-id=416 bgcolor=#d6d6d6
| 254416 ||  || — || November 2, 2004 || Palomar || NEAT || — || align=right | 4.2 km || 
|-id=417 bgcolor=#FFC2E0
| 254417 ||  || — || November 3, 2004 || Catalina || CSS || APO +1km || align=right | 1.2 km || 
|-id=418 bgcolor=#d6d6d6
| 254418 ||  || — || November 3, 2004 || Kitt Peak || Spacewatch || — || align=right | 3.9 km || 
|-id=419 bgcolor=#FFC2E0
| 254419 ||  || — || November 11, 2004 || Catalina || CSS || AMO +1km || align=right data-sort-value="0.63" | 630 m || 
|-id=420 bgcolor=#d6d6d6
| 254420 ||  || — || November 6, 2004 || Socorro || LINEAR || — || align=right | 4.5 km || 
|-id=421 bgcolor=#d6d6d6
| 254421 ||  || — || November 10, 2004 || Kitt Peak || Spacewatch || LIX || align=right | 6.0 km || 
|-id=422 bgcolor=#d6d6d6
| 254422 Henrykent ||  ||  || November 9, 2004 || Mauna Kea || P. A. Wiegert, A. Papadimos || HYG || align=right | 3.9 km || 
|-id=423 bgcolor=#d6d6d6
| 254423 ||  || — || November 19, 2004 || Socorro || LINEAR || — || align=right | 4.5 km || 
|-id=424 bgcolor=#fefefe
| 254424 ||  || — || November 19, 2004 || Socorro || LINEAR || — || align=right | 1.2 km || 
|-id=425 bgcolor=#d6d6d6
| 254425 ||  || — || December 2, 2004 || Catalina || CSS || EUP || align=right | 12 km || 
|-id=426 bgcolor=#d6d6d6
| 254426 ||  || — || December 8, 2004 || Socorro || LINEAR || — || align=right | 5.2 km || 
|-id=427 bgcolor=#d6d6d6
| 254427 ||  || — || December 8, 2004 || Socorro || LINEAR || ELF || align=right | 6.5 km || 
|-id=428 bgcolor=#d6d6d6
| 254428 ||  || — || December 8, 2004 || Socorro || LINEAR || — || align=right | 5.2 km || 
|-id=429 bgcolor=#d6d6d6
| 254429 ||  || — || December 11, 2004 || Socorro || LINEAR || — || align=right | 5.0 km || 
|-id=430 bgcolor=#d6d6d6
| 254430 ||  || — || December 12, 2004 || Kitt Peak || Spacewatch || VER || align=right | 4.0 km || 
|-id=431 bgcolor=#fefefe
| 254431 ||  || — || December 15, 2004 || Socorro || LINEAR || FLO || align=right data-sort-value="0.97" | 970 m || 
|-id=432 bgcolor=#fefefe
| 254432 ||  || — || December 18, 2004 || Mount Lemmon || Mount Lemmon Survey || V || align=right data-sort-value="0.85" | 850 m || 
|-id=433 bgcolor=#fefefe
| 254433 ||  || — || December 18, 2004 || Mount Lemmon || Mount Lemmon Survey || — || align=right | 1.0 km || 
|-id=434 bgcolor=#fefefe
| 254434 ||  || — || January 6, 2005 || Catalina || CSS || FLO || align=right data-sort-value="0.66" | 660 m || 
|-id=435 bgcolor=#fefefe
| 254435 ||  || — || January 6, 2005 || Catalina || CSS || — || align=right data-sort-value="0.86" | 860 m || 
|-id=436 bgcolor=#fefefe
| 254436 ||  || — || January 7, 2005 || Socorro || LINEAR || FLO || align=right data-sort-value="0.85" | 850 m || 
|-id=437 bgcolor=#fefefe
| 254437 ||  || — || January 6, 2005 || Socorro || LINEAR || — || align=right | 1.2 km || 
|-id=438 bgcolor=#fefefe
| 254438 ||  || — || January 6, 2005 || Catalina || CSS || — || align=right | 2.9 km || 
|-id=439 bgcolor=#fefefe
| 254439 ||  || — || January 13, 2005 || Kitt Peak || Spacewatch || — || align=right | 1.1 km || 
|-id=440 bgcolor=#fefefe
| 254440 ||  || — || January 13, 2005 || Kitt Peak || Spacewatch || — || align=right data-sort-value="0.85" | 850 m || 
|-id=441 bgcolor=#fefefe
| 254441 ||  || — || January 13, 2005 || Kitt Peak || Spacewatch || V || align=right data-sort-value="0.92" | 920 m || 
|-id=442 bgcolor=#fefefe
| 254442 ||  || — || January 15, 2005 || Kitt Peak || Spacewatch || — || align=right | 1.1 km || 
|-id=443 bgcolor=#fefefe
| 254443 ||  || — || January 13, 2005 || Kitt Peak || Spacewatch || — || align=right | 1.1 km || 
|-id=444 bgcolor=#fefefe
| 254444 ||  || — || January 13, 2005 || Socorro || LINEAR || — || align=right | 1.2 km || 
|-id=445 bgcolor=#fefefe
| 254445 ||  || — || January 15, 2005 || Kitt Peak || Spacewatch || ERI || align=right | 1.8 km || 
|-id=446 bgcolor=#fefefe
| 254446 ||  || — || January 16, 2005 || Socorro || LINEAR || — || align=right | 1.0 km || 
|-id=447 bgcolor=#fefefe
| 254447 ||  || — || January 16, 2005 || Socorro || LINEAR || — || align=right data-sort-value="0.93" | 930 m || 
|-id=448 bgcolor=#fefefe
| 254448 ||  || — || January 16, 2005 || Kitt Peak || Spacewatch || — || align=right | 1.2 km || 
|-id=449 bgcolor=#fefefe
| 254449 ||  || — || January 16, 2005 || Kitt Peak || Spacewatch || — || align=right | 1.0 km || 
|-id=450 bgcolor=#fefefe
| 254450 ||  || — || January 19, 2005 || Kitt Peak || Spacewatch || — || align=right | 1.8 km || 
|-id=451 bgcolor=#fefefe
| 254451 ||  || — || February 1, 2005 || Catalina || CSS || — || align=right | 1.2 km || 
|-id=452 bgcolor=#fefefe
| 254452 ||  || — || February 1, 2005 || Palomar || NEAT || FLO || align=right data-sort-value="0.96" | 960 m || 
|-id=453 bgcolor=#fefefe
| 254453 ||  || — || February 1, 2005 || Palomar || NEAT || — || align=right | 1.1 km || 
|-id=454 bgcolor=#fefefe
| 254454 ||  || — || February 1, 2005 || Kitt Peak || Spacewatch || — || align=right | 1.4 km || 
|-id=455 bgcolor=#fefefe
| 254455 ||  || — || February 2, 2005 || Kitt Peak || Spacewatch || — || align=right | 1.1 km || 
|-id=456 bgcolor=#fefefe
| 254456 ||  || — || February 2, 2005 || Catalina || CSS || FLO || align=right data-sort-value="0.80" | 800 m || 
|-id=457 bgcolor=#fefefe
| 254457 ||  || — || February 3, 2005 || Socorro || LINEAR || FLO || align=right data-sort-value="0.77" | 770 m || 
|-id=458 bgcolor=#fefefe
| 254458 ||  || — || February 1, 2005 || Kitt Peak || Spacewatch || NYS || align=right data-sort-value="0.72" | 720 m || 
|-id=459 bgcolor=#fefefe
| 254459 ||  || — || February 2, 2005 || Kitt Peak || Spacewatch || — || align=right data-sort-value="0.96" | 960 m || 
|-id=460 bgcolor=#fefefe
| 254460 ||  || — || February 2, 2005 || Catalina || CSS || — || align=right data-sort-value="0.98" | 980 m || 
|-id=461 bgcolor=#fefefe
| 254461 ||  || — || February 2, 2005 || Palomar || NEAT || — || align=right | 1.1 km || 
|-id=462 bgcolor=#fefefe
| 254462 ||  || — || February 4, 2005 || Socorro || LINEAR || — || align=right data-sort-value="0.95" | 950 m || 
|-id=463 bgcolor=#fefefe
| 254463 ||  || — || February 9, 2005 || Kitt Peak || Spacewatch || — || align=right | 2.0 km || 
|-id=464 bgcolor=#fefefe
| 254464 ||  || — || February 9, 2005 || Socorro || LINEAR || — || align=right | 1.3 km || 
|-id=465 bgcolor=#C2FFFF
| 254465 ||  || — || February 9, 2005 || La Silla || A. Boattini, H. Scholl || L4 || align=right | 9.1 km || 
|-id=466 bgcolor=#E9E9E9
| 254466 ||  || — || February 28, 2005 || Catalina || CSS || — || align=right | 2.6 km || 
|-id=467 bgcolor=#E9E9E9
| 254467 ||  || — || February 16, 2005 || La Silla || A. Boattini, H. Scholl || — || align=right | 2.0 km || 
|-id=468 bgcolor=#fefefe
| 254468 ||  || — || March 1, 2005 || Kitt Peak || Spacewatch || — || align=right data-sort-value="0.91" | 910 m || 
|-id=469 bgcolor=#fefefe
| 254469 ||  || — || March 1, 2005 || Goodricke-Pigott || R. A. Tucker || — || align=right | 1.2 km || 
|-id=470 bgcolor=#fefefe
| 254470 ||  || — || March 1, 2005 || Catalina || CSS || — || align=right | 1.1 km || 
|-id=471 bgcolor=#fefefe
| 254471 ||  || — || March 1, 2005 || Kitt Peak || Spacewatch || — || align=right | 1.1 km || 
|-id=472 bgcolor=#fefefe
| 254472 ||  || — || March 1, 2005 || Kitt Peak || Spacewatch || MAS || align=right | 1.0 km || 
|-id=473 bgcolor=#fefefe
| 254473 ||  || — || March 1, 2005 || Kitt Peak || Spacewatch || — || align=right | 1.1 km || 
|-id=474 bgcolor=#fefefe
| 254474 ||  || — || March 2, 2005 || Kitt Peak || Spacewatch || — || align=right | 1.2 km || 
|-id=475 bgcolor=#fefefe
| 254475 ||  || — || March 2, 2005 || Kitt Peak || Spacewatch || — || align=right | 1.1 km || 
|-id=476 bgcolor=#fefefe
| 254476 ||  || — || March 2, 2005 || Catalina || CSS || — || align=right | 1.3 km || 
|-id=477 bgcolor=#fefefe
| 254477 ||  || — || March 2, 2005 || Catalina || CSS || V || align=right data-sort-value="0.99" | 990 m || 
|-id=478 bgcolor=#fefefe
| 254478 ||  || — || March 2, 2005 || Catalina || CSS || — || align=right | 1.2 km || 
|-id=479 bgcolor=#fefefe
| 254479 ||  || — || March 2, 2005 || Catalina || CSS || V || align=right | 1.0 km || 
|-id=480 bgcolor=#fefefe
| 254480 ||  || — || March 2, 2005 || Catalina || CSS || NYS || align=right data-sort-value="0.84" | 840 m || 
|-id=481 bgcolor=#fefefe
| 254481 ||  || — || March 3, 2005 || Kitt Peak || Spacewatch || — || align=right data-sort-value="0.87" | 870 m || 
|-id=482 bgcolor=#fefefe
| 254482 ||  || — || March 3, 2005 || Kitt Peak || Spacewatch || — || align=right | 1.2 km || 
|-id=483 bgcolor=#fefefe
| 254483 ||  || — || March 3, 2005 || Catalina || CSS || — || align=right | 1.1 km || 
|-id=484 bgcolor=#fefefe
| 254484 ||  || — || March 3, 2005 || Kitt Peak || Spacewatch || NYS || align=right data-sort-value="0.91" | 910 m || 
|-id=485 bgcolor=#fefefe
| 254485 ||  || — || March 3, 2005 || Catalina || CSS || NYS || align=right data-sort-value="0.86" | 860 m || 
|-id=486 bgcolor=#fefefe
| 254486 ||  || — || March 3, 2005 || Catalina || CSS || — || align=right data-sort-value="0.98" | 980 m || 
|-id=487 bgcolor=#fefefe
| 254487 ||  || — || March 3, 2005 || Catalina || CSS || — || align=right | 1.4 km || 
|-id=488 bgcolor=#fefefe
| 254488 ||  || — || March 3, 2005 || Catalina || CSS || — || align=right | 1.0 km || 
|-id=489 bgcolor=#fefefe
| 254489 ||  || — || March 3, 2005 || Catalina || CSS || — || align=right | 1.6 km || 
|-id=490 bgcolor=#d6d6d6
| 254490 ||  || — || March 3, 2005 || Kitt Peak || Spacewatch || SHU3:2 || align=right | 8.3 km || 
|-id=491 bgcolor=#fefefe
| 254491 ||  || — || March 3, 2005 || Catalina || CSS || FLO || align=right | 1.0 km || 
|-id=492 bgcolor=#fefefe
| 254492 ||  || — || March 3, 2005 || Kitt Peak || Spacewatch || FLO || align=right | 1.0 km || 
|-id=493 bgcolor=#fefefe
| 254493 ||  || — || March 2, 2005 || Catalina || CSS || — || align=right | 1.1 km || 
|-id=494 bgcolor=#fefefe
| 254494 ||  || — || March 3, 2005 || Catalina || CSS || NYS || align=right data-sort-value="0.82" | 820 m || 
|-id=495 bgcolor=#fefefe
| 254495 ||  || — || March 3, 2005 || Catalina || CSS || V || align=right data-sort-value="0.91" | 910 m || 
|-id=496 bgcolor=#fefefe
| 254496 ||  || — || March 3, 2005 || Catalina || CSS || FLO || align=right data-sort-value="0.94" | 940 m || 
|-id=497 bgcolor=#fefefe
| 254497 ||  || — || March 3, 2005 || Catalina || CSS || — || align=right | 1.4 km || 
|-id=498 bgcolor=#fefefe
| 254498 ||  || — || March 3, 2005 || Catalina || CSS || — || align=right | 1.0 km || 
|-id=499 bgcolor=#fefefe
| 254499 ||  || — || March 3, 2005 || Kitt Peak || Spacewatch || — || align=right data-sort-value="0.86" | 860 m || 
|-id=500 bgcolor=#fefefe
| 254500 ||  || — || March 4, 2005 || Jarnac || Jarnac Obs. || FLO || align=right data-sort-value="0.87" | 870 m || 
|}

254501–254600 

|-bgcolor=#fefefe
| 254501 ||  || — || March 4, 2005 || Socorro || LINEAR || — || align=right | 1.0 km || 
|-id=502 bgcolor=#fefefe
| 254502 ||  || — || March 3, 2005 || Kitt Peak || Spacewatch || NYS || align=right data-sort-value="0.74" | 740 m || 
|-id=503 bgcolor=#fefefe
| 254503 ||  || — || March 3, 2005 || Kitt Peak || Spacewatch || — || align=right | 1.3 km || 
|-id=504 bgcolor=#d6d6d6
| 254504 ||  || — || March 3, 2005 || Kitt Peak || Spacewatch || — || align=right | 3.0 km || 
|-id=505 bgcolor=#fefefe
| 254505 ||  || — || March 3, 2005 || Kitt Peak || Spacewatch || — || align=right data-sort-value="0.85" | 850 m || 
|-id=506 bgcolor=#fefefe
| 254506 ||  || — || March 3, 2005 || Catalina || CSS || V || align=right | 1.0 km || 
|-id=507 bgcolor=#fefefe
| 254507 ||  || — || March 3, 2005 || Catalina || CSS || — || align=right | 1.8 km || 
|-id=508 bgcolor=#fefefe
| 254508 ||  || — || March 4, 2005 || Kitt Peak || Spacewatch || — || align=right data-sort-value="0.96" | 960 m || 
|-id=509 bgcolor=#fefefe
| 254509 ||  || — || March 4, 2005 || Kitt Peak || Spacewatch || NYS || align=right data-sort-value="0.81" | 810 m || 
|-id=510 bgcolor=#fefefe
| 254510 ||  || — || March 4, 2005 || Catalina || CSS || — || align=right | 1.4 km || 
|-id=511 bgcolor=#fefefe
| 254511 ||  || — || March 4, 2005 || Socorro || LINEAR || — || align=right | 1.3 km || 
|-id=512 bgcolor=#fefefe
| 254512 ||  || — || March 4, 2005 || Mount Lemmon || Mount Lemmon Survey || MAS || align=right data-sort-value="0.78" | 780 m || 
|-id=513 bgcolor=#fefefe
| 254513 ||  || — || March 4, 2005 || Mount Lemmon || Mount Lemmon Survey || — || align=right data-sort-value="0.83" | 830 m || 
|-id=514 bgcolor=#fefefe
| 254514 ||  || — || March 4, 2005 || Mount Lemmon || Mount Lemmon Survey || — || align=right data-sort-value="0.96" | 960 m || 
|-id=515 bgcolor=#d6d6d6
| 254515 ||  || — || March 7, 2005 || Socorro || LINEAR || — || align=right | 5.9 km || 
|-id=516 bgcolor=#fefefe
| 254516 ||  || — || March 8, 2005 || Kitt Peak || Spacewatch || FLO || align=right data-sort-value="0.85" | 850 m || 
|-id=517 bgcolor=#fefefe
| 254517 ||  || — || March 8, 2005 || Kitt Peak || Spacewatch || V || align=right data-sort-value="0.85" | 850 m || 
|-id=518 bgcolor=#fefefe
| 254518 ||  || — || March 8, 2005 || Anderson Mesa || LONEOS || — || align=right | 1.3 km || 
|-id=519 bgcolor=#E9E9E9
| 254519 ||  || — || March 8, 2005 || Kitt Peak || Spacewatch || — || align=right | 1.2 km || 
|-id=520 bgcolor=#fefefe
| 254520 ||  || — || March 8, 2005 || Anderson Mesa || LONEOS || — || align=right | 1.1 km || 
|-id=521 bgcolor=#fefefe
| 254521 ||  || — || March 3, 2005 || Catalina || CSS || — || align=right | 1.3 km || 
|-id=522 bgcolor=#fefefe
| 254522 ||  || — || March 4, 2005 || Mount Lemmon || Mount Lemmon Survey || — || align=right | 1.2 km || 
|-id=523 bgcolor=#fefefe
| 254523 ||  || — || March 4, 2005 || Socorro || LINEAR || FLO || align=right data-sort-value="0.98" | 980 m || 
|-id=524 bgcolor=#fefefe
| 254524 ||  || — || March 4, 2005 || Socorro || LINEAR || MAS || align=right data-sort-value="0.97" | 970 m || 
|-id=525 bgcolor=#fefefe
| 254525 ||  || — || March 4, 2005 || Socorro || LINEAR || — || align=right | 1.2 km || 
|-id=526 bgcolor=#fefefe
| 254526 ||  || — || March 7, 2005 || Socorro || LINEAR || — || align=right | 1.4 km || 
|-id=527 bgcolor=#fefefe
| 254527 ||  || — || March 8, 2005 || Kitt Peak || Spacewatch || — || align=right | 1.1 km || 
|-id=528 bgcolor=#fefefe
| 254528 ||  || — || March 8, 2005 || Mount Lemmon || Mount Lemmon Survey || NYS || align=right data-sort-value="0.89" | 890 m || 
|-id=529 bgcolor=#fefefe
| 254529 ||  || — || March 8, 2005 || Anderson Mesa || LONEOS || — || align=right | 1.0 km || 
|-id=530 bgcolor=#fefefe
| 254530 ||  || — || March 8, 2005 || Mount Lemmon || Mount Lemmon Survey || — || align=right | 1.2 km || 
|-id=531 bgcolor=#d6d6d6
| 254531 ||  || — || March 9, 2005 || Kitt Peak || Spacewatch || — || align=right | 3.4 km || 
|-id=532 bgcolor=#fefefe
| 254532 ||  || — || March 9, 2005 || Mount Lemmon || Mount Lemmon Survey || — || align=right data-sort-value="0.94" | 940 m || 
|-id=533 bgcolor=#fefefe
| 254533 ||  || — || March 9, 2005 || Mount Lemmon || Mount Lemmon Survey || — || align=right | 1.2 km || 
|-id=534 bgcolor=#fefefe
| 254534 ||  || — || March 9, 2005 || Mount Lemmon || Mount Lemmon Survey || NYS || align=right data-sort-value="0.98" | 980 m || 
|-id=535 bgcolor=#fefefe
| 254535 ||  || — || March 9, 2005 || Mount Lemmon || Mount Lemmon Survey || — || align=right | 1.2 km || 
|-id=536 bgcolor=#fefefe
| 254536 ||  || — || March 10, 2005 || Mount Lemmon || Mount Lemmon Survey || — || align=right | 1.2 km || 
|-id=537 bgcolor=#fefefe
| 254537 ||  || — || March 10, 2005 || Kitt Peak || Spacewatch || — || align=right | 2.1 km || 
|-id=538 bgcolor=#fefefe
| 254538 ||  || — || March 9, 2005 || Mount Lemmon || Mount Lemmon Survey || — || align=right data-sort-value="0.84" | 840 m || 
|-id=539 bgcolor=#fefefe
| 254539 ||  || — || March 11, 2005 || Kitt Peak || Spacewatch || — || align=right | 1.2 km || 
|-id=540 bgcolor=#fefefe
| 254540 ||  || — || March 8, 2005 || Kitt Peak || Spacewatch || V || align=right data-sort-value="0.72" | 720 m || 
|-id=541 bgcolor=#fefefe
| 254541 ||  || — || March 8, 2005 || Socorro || LINEAR || NYS || align=right data-sort-value="0.79" | 790 m || 
|-id=542 bgcolor=#E9E9E9
| 254542 ||  || — || March 8, 2005 || Socorro || LINEAR || — || align=right | 1.7 km || 
|-id=543 bgcolor=#fefefe
| 254543 ||  || — || March 9, 2005 || Anderson Mesa || LONEOS || — || align=right | 1.3 km || 
|-id=544 bgcolor=#d6d6d6
| 254544 ||  || — || March 10, 2005 || Mount Lemmon || Mount Lemmon Survey || — || align=right | 4.0 km || 
|-id=545 bgcolor=#fefefe
| 254545 ||  || — || March 4, 2005 || Kitt Peak || Spacewatch || FLO || align=right data-sort-value="0.79" | 790 m || 
|-id=546 bgcolor=#fefefe
| 254546 ||  || — || March 9, 2005 || Mount Lemmon || Mount Lemmon Survey || — || align=right | 1.1 km || 
|-id=547 bgcolor=#fefefe
| 254547 ||  || — || March 9, 2005 || Socorro || LINEAR || FLO || align=right data-sort-value="0.98" | 980 m || 
|-id=548 bgcolor=#fefefe
| 254548 ||  || — || March 4, 2005 || Kitt Peak || Spacewatch || NYS || align=right data-sort-value="0.83" | 830 m || 
|-id=549 bgcolor=#fefefe
| 254549 ||  || — || March 4, 2005 || Mount Lemmon || Mount Lemmon Survey || — || align=right | 1.3 km || 
|-id=550 bgcolor=#fefefe
| 254550 ||  || — || March 12, 2005 || Kitt Peak || Spacewatch || — || align=right | 1.1 km || 
|-id=551 bgcolor=#d6d6d6
| 254551 ||  || — || March 9, 2005 || Socorro || LINEAR || HYG || align=right | 3.8 km || 
|-id=552 bgcolor=#fefefe
| 254552 ||  || — || March 11, 2005 || Kitt Peak || Spacewatch || — || align=right | 1.1 km || 
|-id=553 bgcolor=#fefefe
| 254553 ||  || — || March 10, 2005 || Anderson Mesa || LONEOS || FLO || align=right data-sort-value="0.78" | 780 m || 
|-id=554 bgcolor=#fefefe
| 254554 ||  || — || March 13, 2005 || Kitt Peak || Spacewatch || FLO || align=right data-sort-value="0.94" | 940 m || 
|-id=555 bgcolor=#fefefe
| 254555 ||  || — || March 7, 2005 || Socorro || LINEAR || — || align=right | 1.2 km || 
|-id=556 bgcolor=#fefefe
| 254556 ||  || — || March 10, 2005 || Catalina || CSS || — || align=right | 1.2 km || 
|-id=557 bgcolor=#fefefe
| 254557 ||  || — || March 10, 2005 || Anderson Mesa || LONEOS || NYS || align=right data-sort-value="0.74" | 740 m || 
|-id=558 bgcolor=#fefefe
| 254558 ||  || — || March 11, 2005 || Kitt Peak || Spacewatch || — || align=right | 1.1 km || 
|-id=559 bgcolor=#fefefe
| 254559 ||  || — || March 5, 2005 || Siding Spring || SSS || — || align=right | 3.4 km || 
|-id=560 bgcolor=#d6d6d6
| 254560 ||  || — || March 10, 2005 || Catalina || CSS || — || align=right | 3.9 km || 
|-id=561 bgcolor=#fefefe
| 254561 ||  || — || March 9, 2005 || Kitt Peak || M. W. Buie || — || align=right data-sort-value="0.90" | 900 m || 
|-id=562 bgcolor=#fefefe
| 254562 ||  || — || March 12, 2005 || Kitt Peak || Spacewatch || MAS || align=right | 1.0 km || 
|-id=563 bgcolor=#fefefe
| 254563 ||  || — || March 3, 2005 || Catalina || CSS || V || align=right data-sort-value="0.95" | 950 m || 
|-id=564 bgcolor=#E9E9E9
| 254564 ||  || — || March 12, 2005 || Anderson Mesa || LONEOS || — || align=right | 1.7 km || 
|-id=565 bgcolor=#fefefe
| 254565 ||  || — || March 16, 2005 || Mount Lemmon || Mount Lemmon Survey || — || align=right data-sort-value="0.85" | 850 m || 
|-id=566 bgcolor=#fefefe
| 254566 ||  || — || March 16, 2005 || Goodricke-Pigott || R. A. Tucker || V || align=right data-sort-value="0.96" | 960 m || 
|-id=567 bgcolor=#fefefe
| 254567 ||  || — || March 16, 2005 || Socorro || LINEAR || — || align=right | 1.3 km || 
|-id=568 bgcolor=#fefefe
| 254568 ||  || — || March 31, 2005 || Anderson Mesa || LONEOS || — || align=right | 1.0 km || 
|-id=569 bgcolor=#fefefe
| 254569 ||  || — || March 30, 2005 || Catalina || CSS || V || align=right data-sort-value="0.89" | 890 m || 
|-id=570 bgcolor=#fefefe
| 254570 ||  || — || April 1, 2005 || Ottmarsheim || Ottmarsheim Obs. || FLO || align=right data-sort-value="0.98" | 980 m || 
|-id=571 bgcolor=#fefefe
| 254571 ||  || — || April 1, 2005 || Kitt Peak || Spacewatch || NYS || align=right data-sort-value="0.96" | 960 m || 
|-id=572 bgcolor=#fefefe
| 254572 ||  || — || April 1, 2005 || Kitt Peak || Spacewatch || — || align=right | 1.4 km || 
|-id=573 bgcolor=#fefefe
| 254573 ||  || — || April 1, 2005 || Anderson Mesa || LONEOS || — || align=right | 1.4 km || 
|-id=574 bgcolor=#d6d6d6
| 254574 ||  || — || April 1, 2005 || Anderson Mesa || LONEOS || URS || align=right | 5.4 km || 
|-id=575 bgcolor=#fefefe
| 254575 ||  || — || April 1, 2005 || Anderson Mesa || LONEOS || NYS || align=right data-sort-value="0.94" | 940 m || 
|-id=576 bgcolor=#fefefe
| 254576 ||  || — || April 2, 2005 || Mount Lemmon || Mount Lemmon Survey || MAS || align=right data-sort-value="0.96" | 960 m || 
|-id=577 bgcolor=#fefefe
| 254577 ||  || — || April 4, 2005 || Mount Lemmon || Mount Lemmon Survey || MAS || align=right data-sort-value="0.92" | 920 m || 
|-id=578 bgcolor=#fefefe
| 254578 ||  || — || April 4, 2005 || Socorro || LINEAR || NYS || align=right data-sort-value="0.99" | 990 m || 
|-id=579 bgcolor=#d6d6d6
| 254579 ||  || — || April 2, 2005 || Mount Lemmon || Mount Lemmon Survey || BRA || align=right | 1.8 km || 
|-id=580 bgcolor=#fefefe
| 254580 ||  || — || April 4, 2005 || Socorro || LINEAR || — || align=right | 1.1 km || 
|-id=581 bgcolor=#fefefe
| 254581 ||  || — || April 5, 2005 || Mount Lemmon || Mount Lemmon Survey || NYS || align=right data-sort-value="0.71" | 710 m || 
|-id=582 bgcolor=#fefefe
| 254582 ||  || — || April 5, 2005 || Anderson Mesa || LONEOS || — || align=right | 1.0 km || 
|-id=583 bgcolor=#fefefe
| 254583 ||  || — || April 5, 2005 || Mount Lemmon || Mount Lemmon Survey || — || align=right data-sort-value="0.81" | 810 m || 
|-id=584 bgcolor=#fefefe
| 254584 ||  || — || April 5, 2005 || Mount Lemmon || Mount Lemmon Survey || — || align=right data-sort-value="0.91" | 910 m || 
|-id=585 bgcolor=#fefefe
| 254585 ||  || — || April 5, 2005 || Mount Lemmon || Mount Lemmon Survey || — || align=right data-sort-value="0.86" | 860 m || 
|-id=586 bgcolor=#fefefe
| 254586 ||  || — || April 5, 2005 || Mount Lemmon || Mount Lemmon Survey || — || align=right | 1.2 km || 
|-id=587 bgcolor=#fefefe
| 254587 ||  || — || April 2, 2005 || Mount Lemmon || Mount Lemmon Survey || — || align=right | 1.2 km || 
|-id=588 bgcolor=#fefefe
| 254588 ||  || — || April 5, 2005 || Mount Lemmon || Mount Lemmon Survey || V || align=right data-sort-value="0.74" | 740 m || 
|-id=589 bgcolor=#fefefe
| 254589 ||  || — || April 1, 2005 || Kitt Peak || Spacewatch || — || align=right data-sort-value="0.90" | 900 m || 
|-id=590 bgcolor=#fefefe
| 254590 ||  || — || April 2, 2005 || Mount Lemmon || Mount Lemmon Survey || — || align=right | 1.1 km || 
|-id=591 bgcolor=#E9E9E9
| 254591 ||  || — || April 2, 2005 || Mount Lemmon || Mount Lemmon Survey || EUN || align=right | 1.6 km || 
|-id=592 bgcolor=#fefefe
| 254592 ||  || — || April 4, 2005 || Kitt Peak || Spacewatch || — || align=right data-sort-value="0.88" | 880 m || 
|-id=593 bgcolor=#fefefe
| 254593 ||  || — || April 4, 2005 || Mount Lemmon || Mount Lemmon Survey || NYS || align=right data-sort-value="0.71" | 710 m || 
|-id=594 bgcolor=#fefefe
| 254594 ||  || — || April 4, 2005 || Catalina || CSS || FLO || align=right data-sort-value="0.97" | 970 m || 
|-id=595 bgcolor=#fefefe
| 254595 ||  || — || April 4, 2005 || Kitt Peak || Spacewatch || — || align=right | 1.0 km || 
|-id=596 bgcolor=#E9E9E9
| 254596 ||  || — || April 6, 2005 || Kitt Peak || Spacewatch || — || align=right | 1.2 km || 
|-id=597 bgcolor=#fefefe
| 254597 ||  || — || April 6, 2005 || Catalina || CSS || — || align=right | 1.4 km || 
|-id=598 bgcolor=#fefefe
| 254598 ||  || — || April 6, 2005 || Kitt Peak || Spacewatch || — || align=right | 1.2 km || 
|-id=599 bgcolor=#fefefe
| 254599 ||  || — || April 9, 2005 || Kitt Peak || Spacewatch || — || align=right data-sort-value="0.68" | 680 m || 
|-id=600 bgcolor=#fefefe
| 254600 ||  || — || April 9, 2005 || Kitt Peak || Spacewatch || — || align=right | 1.3 km || 
|}

254601–254700 

|-bgcolor=#fefefe
| 254601 ||  || — || April 11, 2005 || Kitt Peak || Spacewatch || — || align=right data-sort-value="0.85" | 850 m || 
|-id=602 bgcolor=#fefefe
| 254602 ||  || — || April 11, 2005 || Mount Lemmon || Mount Lemmon Survey || — || align=right | 1.0 km || 
|-id=603 bgcolor=#fefefe
| 254603 ||  || — || April 9, 2005 || Kitt Peak || Spacewatch || MAS || align=right data-sort-value="0.96" | 960 m || 
|-id=604 bgcolor=#E9E9E9
| 254604 ||  || — || April 7, 2005 || Kitt Peak || Spacewatch || — || align=right | 2.4 km || 
|-id=605 bgcolor=#fefefe
| 254605 ||  || — || April 10, 2005 || Mount Lemmon || Mount Lemmon Survey || MAS || align=right data-sort-value="0.80" | 800 m || 
|-id=606 bgcolor=#fefefe
| 254606 ||  || — || April 11, 2005 || Mount Lemmon || Mount Lemmon Survey || — || align=right | 1.0 km || 
|-id=607 bgcolor=#fefefe
| 254607 ||  || — || April 12, 2005 || Socorro || LINEAR || MAS || align=right data-sort-value="0.98" | 980 m || 
|-id=608 bgcolor=#d6d6d6
| 254608 ||  || — || April 11, 2005 || Kitt Peak || Spacewatch || — || align=right | 4.1 km || 
|-id=609 bgcolor=#E9E9E9
| 254609 ||  || — || April 11, 2005 || Kitt Peak || Spacewatch || — || align=right | 2.6 km || 
|-id=610 bgcolor=#fefefe
| 254610 ||  || — || April 13, 2005 || Anderson Mesa || LONEOS || — || align=right | 1.1 km || 
|-id=611 bgcolor=#E9E9E9
| 254611 ||  || — || April 12, 2005 || Kitt Peak || Spacewatch || — || align=right | 1.1 km || 
|-id=612 bgcolor=#fefefe
| 254612 ||  || — || April 12, 2005 || Kitt Peak || Spacewatch || NYS || align=right | 1.0 km || 
|-id=613 bgcolor=#fefefe
| 254613 ||  || — || April 12, 2005 || Kitt Peak || Spacewatch || V || align=right data-sort-value="0.98" | 980 m || 
|-id=614 bgcolor=#fefefe
| 254614 ||  || — || April 9, 2005 || Mount Lemmon || Mount Lemmon Survey || — || align=right data-sort-value="0.86" | 860 m || 
|-id=615 bgcolor=#fefefe
| 254615 ||  || — || April 4, 2005 || Catalina || CSS || — || align=right | 1.1 km || 
|-id=616 bgcolor=#fefefe
| 254616 ||  || — || April 16, 2005 || Kitt Peak || Spacewatch || V || align=right data-sort-value="0.98" | 980 m || 
|-id=617 bgcolor=#fefefe
| 254617 ||  || — || April 16, 2005 || Kitt Peak || Spacewatch || — || align=right data-sort-value="0.99" | 990 m || 
|-id=618 bgcolor=#E9E9E9
| 254618 ||  || — || April 30, 2005 || Kitt Peak || Spacewatch || — || align=right | 2.0 km || 
|-id=619 bgcolor=#E9E9E9
| 254619 ||  || — || May 2, 2005 || Kitt Peak || Spacewatch || EUN || align=right | 1.6 km || 
|-id=620 bgcolor=#fefefe
| 254620 ||  || — || May 4, 2005 || Mauna Kea || C. Veillet || — || align=right data-sort-value="0.96" | 960 m || 
|-id=621 bgcolor=#E9E9E9
| 254621 ||  || — || May 4, 2005 || Palomar || NEAT || — || align=right | 1.7 km || 
|-id=622 bgcolor=#E9E9E9
| 254622 ||  || — || May 4, 2005 || Catalina || CSS || — || align=right | 1.6 km || 
|-id=623 bgcolor=#E9E9E9
| 254623 ||  || — || May 4, 2005 || Mount Lemmon || Mount Lemmon Survey || — || align=right | 1.4 km || 
|-id=624 bgcolor=#E9E9E9
| 254624 ||  || — || May 3, 2005 || Kitt Peak || Spacewatch || — || align=right | 2.0 km || 
|-id=625 bgcolor=#fefefe
| 254625 ||  || — || May 4, 2005 || Anderson Mesa || LONEOS || — || align=right | 1.1 km || 
|-id=626 bgcolor=#E9E9E9
| 254626 ||  || — || May 4, 2005 || Palomar || NEAT || — || align=right | 1.9 km || 
|-id=627 bgcolor=#fefefe
| 254627 ||  || — || May 4, 2005 || Palomar || NEAT || MAS || align=right | 1.1 km || 
|-id=628 bgcolor=#fefefe
| 254628 ||  || — || May 7, 2005 || Mount Lemmon || Mount Lemmon Survey || V || align=right data-sort-value="0.89" | 890 m || 
|-id=629 bgcolor=#fefefe
| 254629 ||  || — || May 4, 2005 || Kitt Peak || Spacewatch || — || align=right data-sort-value="0.98" | 980 m || 
|-id=630 bgcolor=#C2FFFF
| 254630 ||  || — || May 8, 2005 || Kitt Peak || Spacewatch || L4 || align=right | 12 km || 
|-id=631 bgcolor=#fefefe
| 254631 ||  || — || May 9, 2005 || Mount Lemmon || Mount Lemmon Survey || NYS || align=right data-sort-value="0.84" | 840 m || 
|-id=632 bgcolor=#E9E9E9
| 254632 ||  || — || May 4, 2005 || Palomar || NEAT || — || align=right | 1.5 km || 
|-id=633 bgcolor=#fefefe
| 254633 ||  || — || May 4, 2005 || Palomar || NEAT || — || align=right | 1.4 km || 
|-id=634 bgcolor=#fefefe
| 254634 ||  || — || May 8, 2005 || Siding Spring || SSS || V || align=right | 1.0 km || 
|-id=635 bgcolor=#E9E9E9
| 254635 ||  || — || May 10, 2005 || Mount Lemmon || Mount Lemmon Survey || — || align=right | 2.9 km || 
|-id=636 bgcolor=#E9E9E9
| 254636 ||  || — || May 8, 2005 || Kitt Peak || Spacewatch || — || align=right | 1.4 km || 
|-id=637 bgcolor=#E9E9E9
| 254637 ||  || — || May 4, 2005 || Anderson Mesa || LONEOS || — || align=right | 2.5 km || 
|-id=638 bgcolor=#E9E9E9
| 254638 ||  || — || May 9, 2005 || Kitt Peak || Spacewatch || MAR || align=right | 1.2 km || 
|-id=639 bgcolor=#E9E9E9
| 254639 ||  || — || May 12, 2005 || Mount Lemmon || Mount Lemmon Survey || — || align=right | 1.7 km || 
|-id=640 bgcolor=#E9E9E9
| 254640 ||  || — || May 12, 2005 || Mount Lemmon || Mount Lemmon Survey || — || align=right | 1.4 km || 
|-id=641 bgcolor=#E9E9E9
| 254641 ||  || — || May 9, 2005 || Mount Lemmon || Mount Lemmon Survey || EUN || align=right | 1.3 km || 
|-id=642 bgcolor=#fefefe
| 254642 ||  || — || May 10, 2005 || Socorro || LINEAR || NYS || align=right | 1.0 km || 
|-id=643 bgcolor=#E9E9E9
| 254643 ||  || — || May 10, 2005 || Kitt Peak || Spacewatch || — || align=right | 2.0 km || 
|-id=644 bgcolor=#E9E9E9
| 254644 ||  || — || May 10, 2005 || Kitt Peak || Spacewatch || MAR || align=right | 1.5 km || 
|-id=645 bgcolor=#fefefe
| 254645 ||  || — || May 12, 2005 || Mount Lemmon || Mount Lemmon Survey || MAS || align=right data-sort-value="0.89" | 890 m || 
|-id=646 bgcolor=#fefefe
| 254646 ||  || — || May 12, 2005 || Socorro || LINEAR || — || align=right | 1.1 km || 
|-id=647 bgcolor=#fefefe
| 254647 ||  || — || May 13, 2005 || Socorro || LINEAR || NYS || align=right | 1.0 km || 
|-id=648 bgcolor=#fefefe
| 254648 ||  || — || May 14, 2005 || Kitt Peak || Spacewatch || — || align=right | 1.6 km || 
|-id=649 bgcolor=#fefefe
| 254649 ||  || — || May 14, 2005 || Mount Lemmon || Mount Lemmon Survey || — || align=right data-sort-value="0.88" | 880 m || 
|-id=650 bgcolor=#E9E9E9
| 254650 ||  || — || May 13, 2005 || Kitt Peak || Spacewatch || — || align=right | 1.2 km || 
|-id=651 bgcolor=#fefefe
| 254651 ||  || — || May 14, 2005 || Mount Lemmon || Mount Lemmon Survey || V || align=right data-sort-value="0.86" | 860 m || 
|-id=652 bgcolor=#E9E9E9
| 254652 ||  || — || May 12, 2005 || Palomar || NEAT || — || align=right | 1.3 km || 
|-id=653 bgcolor=#fefefe
| 254653 ||  || — || May 8, 2005 || Mount Lemmon || Mount Lemmon Survey || KLI || align=right | 2.7 km || 
|-id=654 bgcolor=#E9E9E9
| 254654 ||  || — || May 2, 2005 || Siding Spring || SSS || — || align=right | 1.8 km || 
|-id=655 bgcolor=#E9E9E9
| 254655 ||  || — || May 11, 2005 || Mount Lemmon || Mount Lemmon Survey || — || align=right | 1.3 km || 
|-id=656 bgcolor=#fefefe
| 254656 ||  || — || May 10, 2005 || Socorro || LINEAR || V || align=right | 1.0 km || 
|-id=657 bgcolor=#E9E9E9
| 254657 ||  || — || May 17, 2005 || Reedy Creek || J. Broughton || — || align=right | 2.5 km || 
|-id=658 bgcolor=#E9E9E9
| 254658 ||  || — || May 16, 2005 || Kitt Peak || Spacewatch || BRG || align=right | 1.7 km || 
|-id=659 bgcolor=#E9E9E9
| 254659 ||  || — || May 17, 2005 || Mount Lemmon || Mount Lemmon Survey || — || align=right | 1.3 km || 
|-id=660 bgcolor=#fefefe
| 254660 ||  || — || May 19, 2005 || Mount Lemmon || Mount Lemmon Survey || — || align=right data-sort-value="0.96" | 960 m || 
|-id=661 bgcolor=#E9E9E9
| 254661 ||  || — || May 19, 2005 || Palomar || NEAT || ADE || align=right | 2.5 km || 
|-id=662 bgcolor=#fefefe
| 254662 ||  || — || May 20, 2005 || Mount Lemmon || Mount Lemmon Survey || — || align=right | 1.0 km || 
|-id=663 bgcolor=#E9E9E9
| 254663 ||  || — || May 30, 2005 || Siding Spring || SSS || — || align=right | 1.4 km || 
|-id=664 bgcolor=#E9E9E9
| 254664 ||  || — || May 28, 2005 || Campo Imperatore || CINEOS || EUN || align=right | 1.7 km || 
|-id=665 bgcolor=#E9E9E9
| 254665 ||  || — || June 4, 2005 || Reedy Creek || J. Broughton || MIT || align=right | 3.0 km || 
|-id=666 bgcolor=#E9E9E9
| 254666 ||  || — || June 1, 2005 || Kitt Peak || Spacewatch || JUN || align=right | 1.5 km || 
|-id=667 bgcolor=#E9E9E9
| 254667 ||  || — || June 3, 2005 || Siding Spring || SSS || — || align=right | 1.8 km || 
|-id=668 bgcolor=#E9E9E9
| 254668 ||  || — || June 5, 2005 || Kitt Peak || Spacewatch || — || align=right | 1.2 km || 
|-id=669 bgcolor=#C2FFFF
| 254669 ||  || — || June 8, 2005 || Kitt Peak || Spacewatch || L4 || align=right | 19 km || 
|-id=670 bgcolor=#E9E9E9
| 254670 ||  || — || June 8, 2005 || Kitt Peak || Spacewatch || — || align=right | 1.6 km || 
|-id=671 bgcolor=#E9E9E9
| 254671 ||  || — || June 10, 2005 || Kitt Peak || Spacewatch || — || align=right | 1.7 km || 
|-id=672 bgcolor=#fefefe
| 254672 ||  || — || June 12, 2005 || Kitt Peak || Spacewatch || NYS || align=right data-sort-value="0.95" | 950 m || 
|-id=673 bgcolor=#fefefe
| 254673 ||  || — || June 14, 2005 || Kitt Peak || Spacewatch || — || align=right | 1.0 km || 
|-id=674 bgcolor=#E9E9E9
| 254674 ||  || — || June 13, 2005 || Kitt Peak || Spacewatch || ADE || align=right | 1.7 km || 
|-id=675 bgcolor=#E9E9E9
| 254675 ||  || — || June 13, 2005 || Mount Lemmon || Mount Lemmon Survey || — || align=right | 1.4 km || 
|-id=676 bgcolor=#E9E9E9
| 254676 ||  || — || June 13, 2005 || Kitt Peak || Spacewatch || — || align=right | 1.7 km || 
|-id=677 bgcolor=#E9E9E9
| 254677 ||  || — || June 13, 2005 || Mount Lemmon || Mount Lemmon Survey || — || align=right | 1.6 km || 
|-id=678 bgcolor=#E9E9E9
| 254678 ||  || — || June 11, 2005 || Kitt Peak || Spacewatch || — || align=right | 2.9 km || 
|-id=679 bgcolor=#C2FFFF
| 254679 ||  || — || June 13, 2005 || Kitt Peak || Spacewatch || L4 || align=right | 14 km || 
|-id=680 bgcolor=#E9E9E9
| 254680 ||  || — || June 13, 2005 || Mount Lemmon || Mount Lemmon Survey || — || align=right | 1.8 km || 
|-id=681 bgcolor=#C2FFFF
| 254681 ||  || — || June 16, 2005 || Kitt Peak || Spacewatch || L4 || align=right | 16 km || 
|-id=682 bgcolor=#C2FFFF
| 254682 ||  || — || June 16, 2005 || Kitt Peak || Spacewatch || L4 || align=right | 11 km || 
|-id=683 bgcolor=#E9E9E9
| 254683 ||  || — || June 16, 2005 || Kitt Peak || Spacewatch || — || align=right | 1.00 km || 
|-id=684 bgcolor=#fefefe
| 254684 ||  || — || June 17, 2005 || Kitt Peak || Spacewatch || — || align=right data-sort-value="0.98" | 980 m || 
|-id=685 bgcolor=#E9E9E9
| 254685 ||  || — || June 28, 2005 || Kitt Peak || Spacewatch || — || align=right | 3.8 km || 
|-id=686 bgcolor=#E9E9E9
| 254686 ||  || — || June 29, 2005 || Palomar || NEAT || — || align=right | 2.5 km || 
|-id=687 bgcolor=#E9E9E9
| 254687 ||  || — || June 27, 2005 || Kitt Peak || Spacewatch || — || align=right | 3.0 km || 
|-id=688 bgcolor=#E9E9E9
| 254688 ||  || — || June 28, 2005 || Palomar || NEAT || HNA || align=right | 2.8 km || 
|-id=689 bgcolor=#E9E9E9
| 254689 ||  || — || June 30, 2005 || Anderson Mesa || LONEOS || — || align=right | 4.0 km || 
|-id=690 bgcolor=#E9E9E9
| 254690 ||  || — || June 30, 2005 || Kitt Peak || Spacewatch || — || align=right | 1.7 km || 
|-id=691 bgcolor=#C2FFFF
| 254691 ||  || — || June 29, 2005 || Kitt Peak || Spacewatch || L4006 || align=right | 13 km || 
|-id=692 bgcolor=#E9E9E9
| 254692 ||  || — || June 29, 2005 || Palomar || NEAT || — || align=right | 1.8 km || 
|-id=693 bgcolor=#E9E9E9
| 254693 ||  || — || June 28, 2005 || Kitt Peak || Spacewatch || — || align=right | 1.5 km || 
|-id=694 bgcolor=#E9E9E9
| 254694 ||  || — || June 29, 2005 || Kitt Peak || Spacewatch || — || align=right | 2.6 km || 
|-id=695 bgcolor=#fefefe
| 254695 ||  || — || June 28, 2005 || Palomar || NEAT || V || align=right | 1.1 km || 
|-id=696 bgcolor=#E9E9E9
| 254696 ||  || — || June 28, 2005 || Palomar || NEAT || BRU || align=right | 2.8 km || 
|-id=697 bgcolor=#E9E9E9
| 254697 ||  || — || June 30, 2005 || Kitt Peak || Spacewatch || NEM || align=right | 2.5 km || 
|-id=698 bgcolor=#E9E9E9
| 254698 ||  || — || June 30, 2005 || Kitt Peak || Spacewatch || — || align=right | 1.9 km || 
|-id=699 bgcolor=#E9E9E9
| 254699 ||  || — || June 30, 2005 || Kitt Peak || Spacewatch || — || align=right | 2.7 km || 
|-id=700 bgcolor=#E9E9E9
| 254700 ||  || — || June 30, 2005 || Kitt Peak || Spacewatch || — || align=right | 2.1 km || 
|}

254701–254800 

|-bgcolor=#d6d6d6
| 254701 ||  || — || June 28, 2005 || Palomar || NEAT || — || align=right | 3.9 km || 
|-id=702 bgcolor=#E9E9E9
| 254702 ||  || — || June 27, 2005 || Palomar || NEAT || — || align=right | 1.9 km || 
|-id=703 bgcolor=#E9E9E9
| 254703 ||  || — || June 30, 2005 || Palomar || NEAT || — || align=right | 1.2 km || 
|-id=704 bgcolor=#E9E9E9
| 254704 ||  || — || July 1, 2005 || Anderson Mesa || LONEOS || — || align=right | 4.2 km || 
|-id=705 bgcolor=#E9E9E9
| 254705 ||  || — || July 1, 2005 || Palomar || NEAT || GER || align=right | 2.1 km || 
|-id=706 bgcolor=#E9E9E9
| 254706 ||  || — || July 1, 2005 || Catalina || CSS || — || align=right | 1.8 km || 
|-id=707 bgcolor=#E9E9E9
| 254707 ||  || — || July 4, 2005 || Mount Lemmon || Mount Lemmon Survey || — || align=right | 1.5 km || 
|-id=708 bgcolor=#E9E9E9
| 254708 ||  || — || July 2, 2005 || Kitt Peak || Spacewatch || WIT || align=right | 1.2 km || 
|-id=709 bgcolor=#E9E9E9
| 254709 ||  || — || July 3, 2005 || Palomar || NEAT || — || align=right | 3.5 km || 
|-id=710 bgcolor=#E9E9E9
| 254710 ||  || — || July 4, 2005 || Kitt Peak || Spacewatch || — || align=right | 1.5 km || 
|-id=711 bgcolor=#E9E9E9
| 254711 ||  || — || July 4, 2005 || Kitt Peak || Spacewatch || — || align=right | 2.3 km || 
|-id=712 bgcolor=#E9E9E9
| 254712 ||  || — || July 4, 2005 || Kitt Peak || Spacewatch || — || align=right | 1.6 km || 
|-id=713 bgcolor=#E9E9E9
| 254713 ||  || — || July 5, 2005 || Palomar || NEAT || — || align=right | 2.8 km || 
|-id=714 bgcolor=#E9E9E9
| 254714 ||  || — || July 5, 2005 || Kitt Peak || Spacewatch || — || align=right | 1.8 km || 
|-id=715 bgcolor=#E9E9E9
| 254715 ||  || — || July 5, 2005 || Kitt Peak || Spacewatch || HEN || align=right | 1.5 km || 
|-id=716 bgcolor=#E9E9E9
| 254716 ||  || — || July 6, 2005 || Kitt Peak || Spacewatch || AEO || align=right | 2.1 km || 
|-id=717 bgcolor=#E9E9E9
| 254717 ||  || — || July 7, 2005 || Reedy Creek || J. Broughton || — || align=right | 3.6 km || 
|-id=718 bgcolor=#E9E9E9
| 254718 ||  || — || July 3, 2005 || Palomar || NEAT || MAR || align=right | 1.7 km || 
|-id=719 bgcolor=#E9E9E9
| 254719 ||  || — || July 3, 2005 || Mount Lemmon || Mount Lemmon Survey || AER || align=right | 1.8 km || 
|-id=720 bgcolor=#E9E9E9
| 254720 ||  || — || July 10, 2005 || Catalina || CSS || — || align=right | 4.0 km || 
|-id=721 bgcolor=#E9E9E9
| 254721 ||  || — || July 10, 2005 || Kitt Peak || Spacewatch || — || align=right | 1.9 km || 
|-id=722 bgcolor=#E9E9E9
| 254722 ||  || — || July 11, 2005 || Kitt Peak || Spacewatch || — || align=right | 3.2 km || 
|-id=723 bgcolor=#fefefe
| 254723 ||  || — || July 11, 2005 || Kitt Peak || Spacewatch || — || align=right | 1.3 km || 
|-id=724 bgcolor=#E9E9E9
| 254724 ||  || — || July 11, 2005 || Mount Lemmon || Mount Lemmon Survey || — || align=right | 3.1 km || 
|-id=725 bgcolor=#E9E9E9
| 254725 ||  || — || July 1, 2005 || Kitt Peak || Spacewatch || — || align=right | 1.3 km || 
|-id=726 bgcolor=#E9E9E9
| 254726 ||  || — || July 7, 2005 || Kitt Peak || Spacewatch || — || align=right | 2.2 km || 
|-id=727 bgcolor=#E9E9E9
| 254727 ||  || — || July 10, 2005 || Kitt Peak || Spacewatch || — || align=right | 1.1 km || 
|-id=728 bgcolor=#E9E9E9
| 254728 ||  || — || July 10, 2005 || Kitt Peak || Spacewatch || — || align=right | 2.3 km || 
|-id=729 bgcolor=#E9E9E9
| 254729 ||  || — || July 10, 2005 || Reedy Creek || J. Broughton || RAF || align=right | 1.6 km || 
|-id=730 bgcolor=#E9E9E9
| 254730 ||  || — || July 2, 2005 || Catalina || CSS || — || align=right | 3.8 km || 
|-id=731 bgcolor=#E9E9E9
| 254731 ||  || — || July 2, 2005 || Catalina || CSS || — || align=right | 4.5 km || 
|-id=732 bgcolor=#E9E9E9
| 254732 ||  || — || July 6, 2005 || Kitt Peak || Spacewatch || — || align=right | 1.5 km || 
|-id=733 bgcolor=#E9E9E9
| 254733 ||  || — || July 6, 2005 || Kitt Peak || Spacewatch || — || align=right | 3.4 km || 
|-id=734 bgcolor=#E9E9E9
| 254734 ||  || — || July 12, 2005 || Mount Lemmon || Mount Lemmon Survey || NEM || align=right | 2.6 km || 
|-id=735 bgcolor=#E9E9E9
| 254735 ||  || — || July 28, 2005 || Palomar || NEAT || — || align=right | 1.7 km || 
|-id=736 bgcolor=#E9E9E9
| 254736 ||  || — || July 28, 2005 || Palomar || NEAT || NEM || align=right | 3.2 km || 
|-id=737 bgcolor=#E9E9E9
| 254737 ||  || — || July 29, 2005 || Palomar || NEAT || — || align=right | 1.3 km || 
|-id=738 bgcolor=#E9E9E9
| 254738 ||  || — || July 29, 2005 || Palomar || NEAT || WIT || align=right | 1.4 km || 
|-id=739 bgcolor=#E9E9E9
| 254739 ||  || — || July 29, 2005 || Palomar || NEAT || — || align=right | 3.4 km || 
|-id=740 bgcolor=#E9E9E9
| 254740 ||  || — || July 30, 2005 || Palomar || NEAT || — || align=right | 2.6 km || 
|-id=741 bgcolor=#E9E9E9
| 254741 ||  || — || July 30, 2005 || Palomar || NEAT || MRX || align=right | 1.6 km || 
|-id=742 bgcolor=#E9E9E9
| 254742 ||  || — || July 30, 2005 || Palomar || NEAT || — || align=right | 2.7 km || 
|-id=743 bgcolor=#E9E9E9
| 254743 ||  || — || July 31, 2005 || Palomar || NEAT || — || align=right | 2.1 km || 
|-id=744 bgcolor=#E9E9E9
| 254744 ||  || — || July 29, 2005 || Palomar || NEAT || — || align=right | 3.1 km || 
|-id=745 bgcolor=#E9E9E9
| 254745 ||  || — || July 28, 2005 || Eskridge || Farpoint Obs. || — || align=right | 2.0 km || 
|-id=746 bgcolor=#E9E9E9
| 254746 ||  || — || July 30, 2005 || Palomar || NEAT || NEM || align=right | 3.3 km || 
|-id=747 bgcolor=#E9E9E9
| 254747 ||  || — || July 31, 2005 || Palomar || NEAT || — || align=right | 2.5 km || 
|-id=748 bgcolor=#E9E9E9
| 254748 ||  || — || August 1, 2005 || Siding Spring || SSS || — || align=right | 3.1 km || 
|-id=749 bgcolor=#E9E9E9
| 254749 Kurosawa ||  ||  || August 10, 2005 || Saint-Sulpice || B. Christophe || HEN || align=right | 1.2 km || 
|-id=750 bgcolor=#E9E9E9
| 254750 ||  || — || August 4, 2005 || Palomar || NEAT || — || align=right | 2.6 km || 
|-id=751 bgcolor=#E9E9E9
| 254751 ||  || — || August 4, 2005 || Palomar || NEAT || — || align=right | 2.7 km || 
|-id=752 bgcolor=#E9E9E9
| 254752 ||  || — || August 4, 2005 || Palomar || NEAT || AGN || align=right | 1.5 km || 
|-id=753 bgcolor=#E9E9E9
| 254753 ||  || — || August 4, 2005 || Palomar || NEAT || POS || align=right | 3.5 km || 
|-id=754 bgcolor=#E9E9E9
| 254754 ||  || — || August 10, 2005 || Socorro || LINEAR || — || align=right | 3.8 km || 
|-id=755 bgcolor=#E9E9E9
| 254755 ||  || — || August 4, 2005 || Palomar || NEAT || — || align=right | 2.5 km || 
|-id=756 bgcolor=#E9E9E9
| 254756 ||  || — || August 22, 2005 || Palomar || NEAT || — || align=right | 1.9 km || 
|-id=757 bgcolor=#E9E9E9
| 254757 ||  || — || August 22, 2005 || Palomar || NEAT || — || align=right | 3.4 km || 
|-id=758 bgcolor=#E9E9E9
| 254758 ||  || — || August 24, 2005 || Palomar || NEAT || — || align=right | 3.1 km || 
|-id=759 bgcolor=#E9E9E9
| 254759 ||  || — || August 24, 2005 || Palomar || NEAT || — || align=right | 1.8 km || 
|-id=760 bgcolor=#E9E9E9
| 254760 ||  || — || August 24, 2005 || Palomar || NEAT || — || align=right | 3.2 km || 
|-id=761 bgcolor=#E9E9E9
| 254761 ||  || — || August 24, 2005 || Palomar || NEAT || — || align=right | 2.5 km || 
|-id=762 bgcolor=#E9E9E9
| 254762 ||  || — || August 25, 2005 || Palomar || NEAT || AGN || align=right | 1.6 km || 
|-id=763 bgcolor=#E9E9E9
| 254763 ||  || — || August 26, 2005 || Anderson Mesa || LONEOS || — || align=right | 2.3 km || 
|-id=764 bgcolor=#d6d6d6
| 254764 ||  || — || August 27, 2005 || Kitt Peak || Spacewatch || — || align=right | 3.4 km || 
|-id=765 bgcolor=#E9E9E9
| 254765 ||  || — || August 27, 2005 || Kitt Peak || Spacewatch || — || align=right | 2.2 km || 
|-id=766 bgcolor=#E9E9E9
| 254766 ||  || — || August 27, 2005 || Kitt Peak || Spacewatch || NEM || align=right | 2.8 km || 
|-id=767 bgcolor=#d6d6d6
| 254767 ||  || — || August 27, 2005 || Kitt Peak || Spacewatch || KOR || align=right | 1.7 km || 
|-id=768 bgcolor=#E9E9E9
| 254768 ||  || — || August 24, 2005 || Palomar || NEAT || — || align=right | 3.2 km || 
|-id=769 bgcolor=#E9E9E9
| 254769 ||  || — || August 25, 2005 || Palomar || NEAT || — || align=right | 3.4 km || 
|-id=770 bgcolor=#E9E9E9
| 254770 ||  || — || August 25, 2005 || Palomar || NEAT || NEM || align=right | 4.2 km || 
|-id=771 bgcolor=#E9E9E9
| 254771 ||  || — || August 25, 2005 || Palomar || NEAT || MRX || align=right | 1.8 km || 
|-id=772 bgcolor=#E9E9E9
| 254772 ||  || — || August 25, 2005 || Palomar || NEAT || NEM || align=right | 3.0 km || 
|-id=773 bgcolor=#E9E9E9
| 254773 ||  || — || August 25, 2005 || Palomar || NEAT || — || align=right | 2.7 km || 
|-id=774 bgcolor=#E9E9E9
| 254774 ||  || — || August 26, 2005 || Palomar || NEAT || — || align=right | 3.0 km || 
|-id=775 bgcolor=#d6d6d6
| 254775 ||  || — || August 26, 2005 || Anderson Mesa || LONEOS || BRA || align=right | 2.3 km || 
|-id=776 bgcolor=#E9E9E9
| 254776 ||  || — || August 26, 2005 || Palomar || NEAT || DOR || align=right | 4.1 km || 
|-id=777 bgcolor=#E9E9E9
| 254777 ||  || — || August 26, 2005 || Palomar || NEAT || AGN || align=right | 1.5 km || 
|-id=778 bgcolor=#E9E9E9
| 254778 ||  || — || August 26, 2005 || Palomar || NEAT || — || align=right | 2.7 km || 
|-id=779 bgcolor=#E9E9E9
| 254779 ||  || — || August 26, 2005 || Palomar || NEAT || WIT || align=right | 1.6 km || 
|-id=780 bgcolor=#E9E9E9
| 254780 ||  || — || August 26, 2005 || Palomar || NEAT || — || align=right | 4.0 km || 
|-id=781 bgcolor=#E9E9E9
| 254781 ||  || — || August 27, 2005 || Anderson Mesa || LONEOS || — || align=right | 2.6 km || 
|-id=782 bgcolor=#E9E9E9
| 254782 ||  || — || August 28, 2005 || Kitt Peak || Spacewatch || — || align=right | 1.8 km || 
|-id=783 bgcolor=#E9E9E9
| 254783 ||  || — || August 26, 2005 || Palomar || NEAT || — || align=right | 1.3 km || 
|-id=784 bgcolor=#E9E9E9
| 254784 ||  || — || August 26, 2005 || Palomar || NEAT || PAD || align=right | 1.9 km || 
|-id=785 bgcolor=#E9E9E9
| 254785 ||  || — || August 26, 2005 || Palomar || NEAT || — || align=right | 2.3 km || 
|-id=786 bgcolor=#E9E9E9
| 254786 ||  || — || August 26, 2005 || Palomar || NEAT || HEN || align=right | 1.3 km || 
|-id=787 bgcolor=#d6d6d6
| 254787 ||  || — || August 27, 2005 || Anderson Mesa || LONEOS || TRP || align=right | 4.2 km || 
|-id=788 bgcolor=#E9E9E9
| 254788 ||  || — || August 27, 2005 || Anderson Mesa || LONEOS || WIT || align=right | 1.7 km || 
|-id=789 bgcolor=#d6d6d6
| 254789 ||  || — || August 28, 2005 || Kitt Peak || Spacewatch || KOR || align=right | 2.2 km || 
|-id=790 bgcolor=#E9E9E9
| 254790 ||  || — || August 29, 2005 || Anderson Mesa || LONEOS || — || align=right | 4.5 km || 
|-id=791 bgcolor=#E9E9E9
| 254791 ||  || — || August 25, 2005 || Palomar || NEAT || — || align=right | 2.1 km || 
|-id=792 bgcolor=#E9E9E9
| 254792 ||  || — || August 29, 2005 || Anderson Mesa || LONEOS || — || align=right | 2.8 km || 
|-id=793 bgcolor=#d6d6d6
| 254793 ||  || — || August 29, 2005 || Anderson Mesa || LONEOS || TRP || align=right | 2.7 km || 
|-id=794 bgcolor=#E9E9E9
| 254794 ||  || — || August 29, 2005 || Anderson Mesa || LONEOS || — || align=right | 3.3 km || 
|-id=795 bgcolor=#d6d6d6
| 254795 ||  || — || August 30, 2005 || Kitt Peak || Spacewatch || — || align=right | 3.9 km || 
|-id=796 bgcolor=#d6d6d6
| 254796 ||  || — || August 30, 2005 || Kitt Peak || Spacewatch || — || align=right | 3.4 km || 
|-id=797 bgcolor=#E9E9E9
| 254797 ||  || — || August 30, 2005 || Haleakala || NEAT || — || align=right | 3.6 km || 
|-id=798 bgcolor=#E9E9E9
| 254798 ||  || — || August 25, 2005 || Palomar || NEAT || — || align=right | 2.5 km || 
|-id=799 bgcolor=#E9E9E9
| 254799 ||  || — || August 26, 2005 || Anderson Mesa || LONEOS || — || align=right | 3.4 km || 
|-id=800 bgcolor=#d6d6d6
| 254800 ||  || — || August 26, 2005 || Palomar || NEAT || — || align=right | 3.1 km || 
|}

254801–254900 

|-bgcolor=#E9E9E9
| 254801 ||  || — || August 26, 2005 || Palomar || NEAT || — || align=right | 1.7 km || 
|-id=802 bgcolor=#d6d6d6
| 254802 ||  || — || August 27, 2005 || Palomar || NEAT || CHA || align=right | 2.8 km || 
|-id=803 bgcolor=#E9E9E9
| 254803 ||  || — || August 27, 2005 || Palomar || NEAT || — || align=right | 3.1 km || 
|-id=804 bgcolor=#E9E9E9
| 254804 ||  || — || August 27, 2005 || Palomar || NEAT || PAD || align=right | 2.6 km || 
|-id=805 bgcolor=#E9E9E9
| 254805 ||  || — || August 27, 2005 || Palomar || NEAT || NEM || align=right | 2.9 km || 
|-id=806 bgcolor=#E9E9E9
| 254806 ||  || — || August 27, 2005 || Palomar || NEAT || — || align=right | 2.3 km || 
|-id=807 bgcolor=#E9E9E9
| 254807 ||  || — || August 27, 2005 || Palomar || NEAT || — || align=right | 2.3 km || 
|-id=808 bgcolor=#E9E9E9
| 254808 ||  || — || August 27, 2005 || Palomar || NEAT || — || align=right | 3.4 km || 
|-id=809 bgcolor=#d6d6d6
| 254809 ||  || — || August 27, 2005 || Palomar || NEAT || KAR || align=right | 1.4 km || 
|-id=810 bgcolor=#E9E9E9
| 254810 ||  || — || August 27, 2005 || Palomar || NEAT || — || align=right | 3.0 km || 
|-id=811 bgcolor=#E9E9E9
| 254811 ||  || — || August 28, 2005 || Kitt Peak || Spacewatch || — || align=right | 2.3 km || 
|-id=812 bgcolor=#E9E9E9
| 254812 ||  || — || August 28, 2005 || Kitt Peak || Spacewatch || — || align=right | 2.3 km || 
|-id=813 bgcolor=#E9E9E9
| 254813 ||  || — || August 28, 2005 || Kitt Peak || Spacewatch || — || align=right | 2.2 km || 
|-id=814 bgcolor=#d6d6d6
| 254814 ||  || — || August 28, 2005 || Kitt Peak || Spacewatch || KOR || align=right | 1.6 km || 
|-id=815 bgcolor=#d6d6d6
| 254815 ||  || — || August 28, 2005 || Kitt Peak || Spacewatch || KOR || align=right | 1.4 km || 
|-id=816 bgcolor=#d6d6d6
| 254816 ||  || — || August 28, 2005 || Kitt Peak || Spacewatch || KOR || align=right | 1.5 km || 
|-id=817 bgcolor=#E9E9E9
| 254817 ||  || — || August 28, 2005 || Kitt Peak || Spacewatch || — || align=right | 2.8 km || 
|-id=818 bgcolor=#E9E9E9
| 254818 ||  || — || August 28, 2005 || Kitt Peak || Spacewatch || HOF || align=right | 2.7 km || 
|-id=819 bgcolor=#E9E9E9
| 254819 ||  || — || August 28, 2005 || Kitt Peak || Spacewatch || — || align=right | 1.7 km || 
|-id=820 bgcolor=#d6d6d6
| 254820 ||  || — || August 28, 2005 || Kitt Peak || Spacewatch || SAN || align=right | 2.4 km || 
|-id=821 bgcolor=#E9E9E9
| 254821 ||  || — || August 28, 2005 || Kitt Peak || Spacewatch || — || align=right | 2.5 km || 
|-id=822 bgcolor=#E9E9E9
| 254822 ||  || — || August 28, 2005 || Kitt Peak || Spacewatch || AGN || align=right | 1.9 km || 
|-id=823 bgcolor=#E9E9E9
| 254823 ||  || — || August 28, 2005 || Kitt Peak || Spacewatch || — || align=right | 3.0 km || 
|-id=824 bgcolor=#E9E9E9
| 254824 ||  || — || August 30, 2005 || Kitt Peak || Spacewatch || — || align=right | 3.1 km || 
|-id=825 bgcolor=#d6d6d6
| 254825 ||  || — || August 27, 2005 || Palomar || NEAT || — || align=right | 4.3 km || 
|-id=826 bgcolor=#E9E9E9
| 254826 ||  || — || August 27, 2005 || Palomar || NEAT || — || align=right | 3.6 km || 
|-id=827 bgcolor=#E9E9E9
| 254827 ||  || — || August 28, 2005 || Siding Spring || SSS || — || align=right | 1.5 km || 
|-id=828 bgcolor=#d6d6d6
| 254828 ||  || — || August 30, 2005 || Kitt Peak || Spacewatch || EOS || align=right | 2.0 km || 
|-id=829 bgcolor=#E9E9E9
| 254829 ||  || — || August 30, 2005 || Kitt Peak || Spacewatch || — || align=right | 2.0 km || 
|-id=830 bgcolor=#E9E9E9
| 254830 ||  || — || August 26, 2005 || Palomar || NEAT || — || align=right | 3.4 km || 
|-id=831 bgcolor=#d6d6d6
| 254831 ||  || — || August 30, 2005 || Palomar || NEAT || — || align=right | 2.4 km || 
|-id=832 bgcolor=#d6d6d6
| 254832 ||  || — || August 30, 2005 || Palomar || NEAT || EUP || align=right | 5.5 km || 
|-id=833 bgcolor=#E9E9E9
| 254833 ||  || — || August 31, 2005 || Palomar || NEAT || DOR || align=right | 3.4 km || 
|-id=834 bgcolor=#d6d6d6
| 254834 ||  || — || August 31, 2005 || Palomar || NEAT || — || align=right | 2.4 km || 
|-id=835 bgcolor=#E9E9E9
| 254835 ||  || — || August 29, 2005 || Palomar || NEAT || — || align=right | 3.4 km || 
|-id=836 bgcolor=#E9E9E9
| 254836 ||  || — || August 29, 2005 || Palomar || NEAT || — || align=right | 4.0 km || 
|-id=837 bgcolor=#E9E9E9
| 254837 ||  || — || August 31, 2005 || Anderson Mesa || LONEOS || GEF || align=right | 1.9 km || 
|-id=838 bgcolor=#d6d6d6
| 254838 ||  || — || August 31, 2005 || Socorro || LINEAR || — || align=right | 4.6 km || 
|-id=839 bgcolor=#E9E9E9
| 254839 ||  || — || August 29, 2005 || Palomar || NEAT || WIT || align=right | 1.5 km || 
|-id=840 bgcolor=#d6d6d6
| 254840 ||  || — || August 26, 2005 || Palomar || NEAT || CHA || align=right | 2.5 km || 
|-id=841 bgcolor=#d6d6d6
| 254841 ||  || — || August 29, 2005 || Anderson Mesa || LONEOS || — || align=right | 3.2 km || 
|-id=842 bgcolor=#E9E9E9
| 254842 ||  || — || August 31, 2005 || Kitt Peak || Spacewatch || AGN || align=right | 1.5 km || 
|-id=843 bgcolor=#E9E9E9
| 254843 ||  || — || August 30, 2005 || Kitt Peak || Spacewatch || AGN || align=right | 1.3 km || 
|-id=844 bgcolor=#E9E9E9
| 254844 ||  || — || August 29, 2005 || Palomar || NEAT || — || align=right | 3.9 km || 
|-id=845 bgcolor=#E9E9E9
| 254845 ||  || — || September 1, 2005 || Siding Spring || SSS || — || align=right | 4.1 km || 
|-id=846 bgcolor=#d6d6d6
| 254846 Csontváry ||  ||  || September 5, 2005 || Piszkéstető || K. Sárneczky || — || align=right | 2.5 km || 
|-id=847 bgcolor=#E9E9E9
| 254847 ||  || — || September 3, 2005 || Bergisch Gladbach || W. Bickel || CLO || align=right | 3.1 km || 
|-id=848 bgcolor=#E9E9E9
| 254848 ||  || — || September 8, 2005 || Socorro || LINEAR || — || align=right | 3.4 km || 
|-id=849 bgcolor=#E9E9E9
| 254849 ||  || — || September 9, 2005 || Mayhill || A. Lowe || — || align=right | 4.0 km || 
|-id=850 bgcolor=#d6d6d6
| 254850 ||  || — || September 1, 2005 || Anderson Mesa || LONEOS || BRA || align=right | 2.1 km || 
|-id=851 bgcolor=#E9E9E9
| 254851 ||  || — || September 1, 2005 || Anderson Mesa || LONEOS || — || align=right | 1.8 km || 
|-id=852 bgcolor=#E9E9E9
| 254852 ||  || — || September 1, 2005 || Kitt Peak || Spacewatch || AST || align=right | 2.3 km || 
|-id=853 bgcolor=#E9E9E9
| 254853 ||  || — || September 1, 2005 || Palomar || NEAT || GEF || align=right | 1.8 km || 
|-id=854 bgcolor=#E9E9E9
| 254854 ||  || — || September 6, 2005 || Socorro || LINEAR || — || align=right | 2.6 km || 
|-id=855 bgcolor=#E9E9E9
| 254855 ||  || — || September 9, 2005 || Socorro || LINEAR || GEF || align=right | 1.7 km || 
|-id=856 bgcolor=#E9E9E9
| 254856 ||  || — || September 14, 2005 || Socorro || LINEAR || BRU || align=right | 5.0 km || 
|-id=857 bgcolor=#d6d6d6
| 254857 ||  || — || September 12, 2005 || Junk Bond || D. Healy || KOR || align=right | 1.7 km || 
|-id=858 bgcolor=#d6d6d6
| 254858 ||  || — || September 3, 2005 || Catalina || CSS || FIR || align=right | 4.1 km || 
|-id=859 bgcolor=#d6d6d6
| 254859 ||  || — || September 3, 2005 || Palomar || NEAT || EOS || align=right | 2.4 km || 
|-id=860 bgcolor=#E9E9E9
| 254860 ||  || — || September 14, 2005 || Catalina || CSS || — || align=right | 3.7 km || 
|-id=861 bgcolor=#d6d6d6
| 254861 ||  || — || September 1, 2005 || Palomar || NEAT || FIR || align=right | 4.1 km || 
|-id=862 bgcolor=#d6d6d6
| 254862 ||  || — || September 23, 2005 || Goodricke-Pigott || R. A. Tucker || — || align=right | 3.0 km || 
|-id=863 bgcolor=#E9E9E9
| 254863 Robinwarren ||  ||  || September 24, 2005 || Vallemare di Borbona || V. S. Casulli || — || align=right | 2.5 km || 
|-id=864 bgcolor=#E9E9E9
| 254864 ||  || — || September 23, 2005 || Catalina || CSS || PAD || align=right | 2.3 km || 
|-id=865 bgcolor=#d6d6d6
| 254865 ||  || — || September 24, 2005 || Kitt Peak || Spacewatch || KOR || align=right | 1.8 km || 
|-id=866 bgcolor=#d6d6d6
| 254866 ||  || — || September 25, 2005 || Catalina || CSS || — || align=right | 2.9 km || 
|-id=867 bgcolor=#E9E9E9
| 254867 ||  || — || September 23, 2005 || Kitt Peak || Spacewatch || AST || align=right | 2.3 km || 
|-id=868 bgcolor=#d6d6d6
| 254868 ||  || — || September 23, 2005 || Kitt Peak || Spacewatch || — || align=right | 3.0 km || 
|-id=869 bgcolor=#d6d6d6
| 254869 ||  || — || September 23, 2005 || Kitt Peak || Spacewatch || — || align=right | 3.8 km || 
|-id=870 bgcolor=#E9E9E9
| 254870 ||  || — || September 23, 2005 || Kitt Peak || Spacewatch || — || align=right | 2.6 km || 
|-id=871 bgcolor=#d6d6d6
| 254871 ||  || — || September 23, 2005 || Catalina || CSS || — || align=right | 4.2 km || 
|-id=872 bgcolor=#E9E9E9
| 254872 ||  || — || September 24, 2005 || Kitt Peak || Spacewatch || WIT || align=right | 1.5 km || 
|-id=873 bgcolor=#E9E9E9
| 254873 ||  || — || September 26, 2005 || Kitt Peak || Spacewatch || — || align=right | 2.7 km || 
|-id=874 bgcolor=#E9E9E9
| 254874 ||  || — || September 26, 2005 || Kitt Peak || Spacewatch || WIT || align=right | 1.3 km || 
|-id=875 bgcolor=#E9E9E9
| 254875 ||  || — || September 26, 2005 || Kitt Peak || Spacewatch || MIS || align=right | 3.5 km || 
|-id=876 bgcolor=#E9E9E9
| 254876 Strommer ||  ||  || September 24, 2005 || Piszkéstető || K. Sárneczky || — || align=right | 2.5 km || 
|-id=877 bgcolor=#E9E9E9
| 254877 ||  || — || September 23, 2005 || Kitt Peak || Spacewatch || — || align=right | 2.7 km || 
|-id=878 bgcolor=#E9E9E9
| 254878 ||  || — || September 23, 2005 || Kitt Peak || Spacewatch || — || align=right | 2.4 km || 
|-id=879 bgcolor=#E9E9E9
| 254879 ||  || — || September 25, 2005 || Catalina || CSS || — || align=right | 3.3 km || 
|-id=880 bgcolor=#d6d6d6
| 254880 ||  || — || September 23, 2005 || Kitt Peak || Spacewatch || CHA || align=right | 3.3 km || 
|-id=881 bgcolor=#E9E9E9
| 254881 ||  || — || September 23, 2005 || Kitt Peak || Spacewatch || — || align=right | 3.0 km || 
|-id=882 bgcolor=#E9E9E9
| 254882 ||  || — || September 23, 2005 || Kitt Peak || Spacewatch || — || align=right | 2.8 km || 
|-id=883 bgcolor=#d6d6d6
| 254883 ||  || — || September 23, 2005 || Kitt Peak || Spacewatch || — || align=right | 3.1 km || 
|-id=884 bgcolor=#E9E9E9
| 254884 ||  || — || September 23, 2005 || Catalina || CSS || GEF || align=right | 2.0 km || 
|-id=885 bgcolor=#d6d6d6
| 254885 ||  || — || September 23, 2005 || Kitt Peak || Spacewatch || KOR || align=right | 1.7 km || 
|-id=886 bgcolor=#d6d6d6
| 254886 ||  || — || September 23, 2005 || Kitt Peak || Spacewatch || — || align=right | 3.4 km || 
|-id=887 bgcolor=#E9E9E9
| 254887 ||  || — || September 23, 2005 || Kitt Peak || Spacewatch || — || align=right | 3.9 km || 
|-id=888 bgcolor=#d6d6d6
| 254888 ||  || — || September 23, 2005 || Kitt Peak || Spacewatch || KOR || align=right | 1.6 km || 
|-id=889 bgcolor=#E9E9E9
| 254889 ||  || — || September 24, 2005 || Kitt Peak || Spacewatch || — || align=right | 3.0 km || 
|-id=890 bgcolor=#d6d6d6
| 254890 ||  || — || September 24, 2005 || Kitt Peak || Spacewatch || — || align=right | 3.2 km || 
|-id=891 bgcolor=#E9E9E9
| 254891 ||  || — || September 24, 2005 || Kitt Peak || Spacewatch || HOF || align=right | 2.8 km || 
|-id=892 bgcolor=#d6d6d6
| 254892 ||  || — || September 26, 2005 || Kitt Peak || Spacewatch || KOR || align=right | 1.6 km || 
|-id=893 bgcolor=#E9E9E9
| 254893 ||  || — || September 26, 2005 || Kitt Peak || Spacewatch || XIZ || align=right | 2.0 km || 
|-id=894 bgcolor=#E9E9E9
| 254894 ||  || — || September 26, 2005 || Kitt Peak || Spacewatch || WIT || align=right | 1.7 km || 
|-id=895 bgcolor=#d6d6d6
| 254895 ||  || — || September 26, 2005 || Kitt Peak || Spacewatch || — || align=right | 3.1 km || 
|-id=896 bgcolor=#d6d6d6
| 254896 ||  || — || September 26, 2005 || Kitt Peak || Spacewatch || 629 || align=right | 1.6 km || 
|-id=897 bgcolor=#E9E9E9
| 254897 ||  || — || September 27, 2005 || Kitt Peak || Spacewatch || — || align=right | 2.9 km || 
|-id=898 bgcolor=#E9E9E9
| 254898 ||  || — || September 23, 2005 || Kitt Peak || Spacewatch || — || align=right | 4.4 km || 
|-id=899 bgcolor=#d6d6d6
| 254899 ||  || — || September 24, 2005 || Kitt Peak || Spacewatch || LIX || align=right | 4.4 km || 
|-id=900 bgcolor=#d6d6d6
| 254900 ||  || — || September 24, 2005 || Kitt Peak || Spacewatch || KOR || align=right | 1.4 km || 
|}

254901–255000 

|-bgcolor=#d6d6d6
| 254901 ||  || — || September 24, 2005 || Kitt Peak || Spacewatch || KOR || align=right | 1.6 km || 
|-id=902 bgcolor=#d6d6d6
| 254902 ||  || — || September 24, 2005 || Kitt Peak || Spacewatch || — || align=right | 3.1 km || 
|-id=903 bgcolor=#d6d6d6
| 254903 ||  || — || September 24, 2005 || Kitt Peak || Spacewatch || KOR || align=right | 1.6 km || 
|-id=904 bgcolor=#d6d6d6
| 254904 ||  || — || September 24, 2005 || Kitt Peak || Spacewatch || — || align=right | 2.8 km || 
|-id=905 bgcolor=#d6d6d6
| 254905 ||  || — || September 24, 2005 || Kitt Peak || Spacewatch || KOR || align=right | 1.5 km || 
|-id=906 bgcolor=#d6d6d6
| 254906 ||  || — || September 24, 2005 || Kitt Peak || Spacewatch || — || align=right | 2.8 km || 
|-id=907 bgcolor=#E9E9E9
| 254907 ||  || — || September 24, 2005 || Kitt Peak || Spacewatch || — || align=right | 2.3 km || 
|-id=908 bgcolor=#d6d6d6
| 254908 ||  || — || September 24, 2005 || Kitt Peak || Spacewatch || — || align=right | 4.4 km || 
|-id=909 bgcolor=#d6d6d6
| 254909 ||  || — || September 24, 2005 || Kitt Peak || Spacewatch || K-2 || align=right | 1.7 km || 
|-id=910 bgcolor=#E9E9E9
| 254910 ||  || — || September 25, 2005 || Kitt Peak || Spacewatch || — || align=right | 2.8 km || 
|-id=911 bgcolor=#d6d6d6
| 254911 ||  || — || September 25, 2005 || Kitt Peak || Spacewatch || KOR || align=right | 1.7 km || 
|-id=912 bgcolor=#d6d6d6
| 254912 ||  || — || September 25, 2005 || Kitt Peak || Spacewatch || — || align=right | 3.2 km || 
|-id=913 bgcolor=#E9E9E9
| 254913 ||  || — || September 25, 2005 || Kitt Peak || Spacewatch || — || align=right | 3.1 km || 
|-id=914 bgcolor=#d6d6d6
| 254914 ||  || — || September 25, 2005 || Kitt Peak || Spacewatch || — || align=right | 3.3 km || 
|-id=915 bgcolor=#d6d6d6
| 254915 ||  || — || September 25, 2005 || Kitt Peak || Spacewatch || VER || align=right | 4.3 km || 
|-id=916 bgcolor=#d6d6d6
| 254916 ||  || — || September 26, 2005 || Kitt Peak || Spacewatch || — || align=right | 3.0 km || 
|-id=917 bgcolor=#E9E9E9
| 254917 ||  || — || September 26, 2005 || Catalina || CSS || — || align=right | 3.6 km || 
|-id=918 bgcolor=#d6d6d6
| 254918 ||  || — || September 26, 2005 || Kitt Peak || Spacewatch || KOR || align=right | 1.6 km || 
|-id=919 bgcolor=#d6d6d6
| 254919 ||  || — || September 26, 2005 || Kitt Peak || Spacewatch || — || align=right | 3.3 km || 
|-id=920 bgcolor=#d6d6d6
| 254920 ||  || — || September 27, 2005 || Kitt Peak || Spacewatch || EOS || align=right | 2.1 km || 
|-id=921 bgcolor=#E9E9E9
| 254921 ||  || — || September 28, 2005 || Palomar || NEAT || — || align=right | 3.3 km || 
|-id=922 bgcolor=#E9E9E9
| 254922 ||  || — || September 29, 2005 || Kitt Peak || Spacewatch || HOF || align=right | 3.6 km || 
|-id=923 bgcolor=#d6d6d6
| 254923 ||  || — || September 29, 2005 || Kitt Peak || Spacewatch || — || align=right | 3.6 km || 
|-id=924 bgcolor=#d6d6d6
| 254924 ||  || — || September 29, 2005 || Kitt Peak || Spacewatch || — || align=right | 3.0 km || 
|-id=925 bgcolor=#E9E9E9
| 254925 ||  || — || September 29, 2005 || Mount Lemmon || Mount Lemmon Survey || HEN || align=right | 1.4 km || 
|-id=926 bgcolor=#d6d6d6
| 254926 ||  || — || September 29, 2005 || Anderson Mesa || LONEOS || — || align=right | 2.9 km || 
|-id=927 bgcolor=#E9E9E9
| 254927 ||  || — || September 29, 2005 || Anderson Mesa || LONEOS || GEF || align=right | 1.6 km || 
|-id=928 bgcolor=#d6d6d6
| 254928 ||  || — || September 29, 2005 || Mount Lemmon || Mount Lemmon Survey || — || align=right | 3.0 km || 
|-id=929 bgcolor=#d6d6d6
| 254929 ||  || — || September 24, 2005 || Kitt Peak || Spacewatch || KOR || align=right | 1.5 km || 
|-id=930 bgcolor=#d6d6d6
| 254930 ||  || — || September 24, 2005 || Kitt Peak || Spacewatch || — || align=right | 2.1 km || 
|-id=931 bgcolor=#d6d6d6
| 254931 ||  || — || September 24, 2005 || Kitt Peak || Spacewatch || KOR || align=right | 1.9 km || 
|-id=932 bgcolor=#d6d6d6
| 254932 ||  || — || September 24, 2005 || Kitt Peak || Spacewatch || — || align=right | 2.7 km || 
|-id=933 bgcolor=#E9E9E9
| 254933 ||  || — || September 25, 2005 || Kitt Peak || Spacewatch || MRX || align=right | 1.1 km || 
|-id=934 bgcolor=#d6d6d6
| 254934 ||  || — || September 25, 2005 || Kitt Peak || Spacewatch || KOR || align=right | 1.5 km || 
|-id=935 bgcolor=#d6d6d6
| 254935 ||  || — || September 25, 2005 || Kitt Peak || Spacewatch || — || align=right | 4.1 km || 
|-id=936 bgcolor=#d6d6d6
| 254936 ||  || — || September 25, 2005 || Kitt Peak || Spacewatch || — || align=right | 2.8 km || 
|-id=937 bgcolor=#d6d6d6
| 254937 ||  || — || September 25, 2005 || Kitt Peak || Spacewatch || EOS || align=right | 2.3 km || 
|-id=938 bgcolor=#d6d6d6
| 254938 ||  || — || September 26, 2005 || Kitt Peak || Spacewatch || TEL || align=right | 1.8 km || 
|-id=939 bgcolor=#E9E9E9
| 254939 ||  || — || September 26, 2005 || Palomar || NEAT || KON || align=right | 3.6 km || 
|-id=940 bgcolor=#d6d6d6
| 254940 ||  || — || September 27, 2005 || Kitt Peak || Spacewatch || KOR || align=right | 1.3 km || 
|-id=941 bgcolor=#E9E9E9
| 254941 ||  || — || September 27, 2005 || Kitt Peak || Spacewatch || AGN || align=right | 1.9 km || 
|-id=942 bgcolor=#d6d6d6
| 254942 ||  || — || September 27, 2005 || Palomar || NEAT || — || align=right | 3.2 km || 
|-id=943 bgcolor=#E9E9E9
| 254943 ||  || — || September 27, 2005 || Palomar || NEAT || — || align=right | 3.2 km || 
|-id=944 bgcolor=#E9E9E9
| 254944 ||  || — || September 29, 2005 || Kitt Peak || Spacewatch || PAD || align=right | 2.1 km || 
|-id=945 bgcolor=#E9E9E9
| 254945 ||  || — || September 29, 2005 || Anderson Mesa || LONEOS || AEO || align=right | 1.4 km || 
|-id=946 bgcolor=#d6d6d6
| 254946 ||  || — || September 29, 2005 || Kitt Peak || Spacewatch || — || align=right | 2.8 km || 
|-id=947 bgcolor=#d6d6d6
| 254947 ||  || — || September 29, 2005 || Kitt Peak || Spacewatch || — || align=right | 2.8 km || 
|-id=948 bgcolor=#E9E9E9
| 254948 ||  || — || September 29, 2005 || Anderson Mesa || LONEOS || DOR || align=right | 3.2 km || 
|-id=949 bgcolor=#d6d6d6
| 254949 ||  || — || September 29, 2005 || Mount Lemmon || Mount Lemmon Survey || — || align=right | 3.0 km || 
|-id=950 bgcolor=#E9E9E9
| 254950 ||  || — || September 29, 2005 || Kitt Peak || Spacewatch || — || align=right | 3.1 km || 
|-id=951 bgcolor=#d6d6d6
| 254951 ||  || — || September 30, 2005 || Kitt Peak || Spacewatch || — || align=right | 1.8 km || 
|-id=952 bgcolor=#E9E9E9
| 254952 ||  || — || September 30, 2005 || Mount Lemmon || Mount Lemmon Survey || — || align=right | 2.6 km || 
|-id=953 bgcolor=#d6d6d6
| 254953 ||  || — || September 30, 2005 || Kitt Peak || Spacewatch || KOR || align=right | 1.5 km || 
|-id=954 bgcolor=#E9E9E9
| 254954 ||  || — || September 30, 2005 || Kitt Peak || Spacewatch || AGN || align=right | 1.4 km || 
|-id=955 bgcolor=#d6d6d6
| 254955 ||  || — || September 30, 2005 || Anderson Mesa || LONEOS || — || align=right | 2.4 km || 
|-id=956 bgcolor=#E9E9E9
| 254956 ||  || — || September 30, 2005 || Palomar || NEAT || GEF || align=right | 2.1 km || 
|-id=957 bgcolor=#d6d6d6
| 254957 ||  || — || September 30, 2005 || Anderson Mesa || LONEOS || — || align=right | 3.5 km || 
|-id=958 bgcolor=#d6d6d6
| 254958 ||  || — || September 30, 2005 || Kitt Peak || Spacewatch || CHA || align=right | 2.5 km || 
|-id=959 bgcolor=#d6d6d6
| 254959 ||  || — || September 30, 2005 || Kitt Peak || Spacewatch || — || align=right | 3.3 km || 
|-id=960 bgcolor=#d6d6d6
| 254960 ||  || — || September 30, 2005 || Palomar || NEAT || — || align=right | 3.4 km || 
|-id=961 bgcolor=#E9E9E9
| 254961 ||  || — || September 30, 2005 || Palomar || NEAT || AGN || align=right | 1.4 km || 
|-id=962 bgcolor=#d6d6d6
| 254962 ||  || — || September 30, 2005 || Palomar || NEAT || — || align=right | 3.3 km || 
|-id=963 bgcolor=#d6d6d6
| 254963 ||  || — || September 30, 2005 || Palomar || NEAT || — || align=right | 3.7 km || 
|-id=964 bgcolor=#d6d6d6
| 254964 ||  || — || September 30, 2005 || Palomar || NEAT || — || align=right | 3.9 km || 
|-id=965 bgcolor=#d6d6d6
| 254965 ||  || — || September 30, 2005 || Kitt Peak || Spacewatch || — || align=right | 3.3 km || 
|-id=966 bgcolor=#d6d6d6
| 254966 ||  || — || September 30, 2005 || Kitt Peak || Spacewatch || — || align=right | 2.3 km || 
|-id=967 bgcolor=#E9E9E9
| 254967 ||  || — || September 30, 2005 || Mount Lemmon || Mount Lemmon Survey || — || align=right | 2.2 km || 
|-id=968 bgcolor=#E9E9E9
| 254968 ||  || — || September 30, 2005 || Mount Lemmon || Mount Lemmon Survey || — || align=right | 2.6 km || 
|-id=969 bgcolor=#d6d6d6
| 254969 ||  || — || September 30, 2005 || Mount Lemmon || Mount Lemmon Survey || — || align=right | 2.0 km || 
|-id=970 bgcolor=#d6d6d6
| 254970 ||  || — || September 29, 2005 || Kitt Peak || Spacewatch || TRE || align=right | 3.8 km || 
|-id=971 bgcolor=#E9E9E9
| 254971 ||  || — || September 30, 2005 || Kitt Peak || Spacewatch || — || align=right | 2.9 km || 
|-id=972 bgcolor=#E9E9E9
| 254972 ||  || — || September 30, 2005 || Mount Lemmon || Mount Lemmon Survey || — || align=right | 3.2 km || 
|-id=973 bgcolor=#d6d6d6
| 254973 ||  || — || September 30, 2005 || Kitt Peak || Spacewatch || — || align=right | 4.6 km || 
|-id=974 bgcolor=#d6d6d6
| 254974 ||  || — || September 30, 2005 || Kitt Peak || Spacewatch || VER || align=right | 3.9 km || 
|-id=975 bgcolor=#d6d6d6
| 254975 ||  || — || September 30, 2005 || Kitt Peak || Spacewatch || — || align=right | 3.0 km || 
|-id=976 bgcolor=#d6d6d6
| 254976 ||  || — || September 23, 2005 || Kitt Peak || Spacewatch || — || align=right | 3.6 km || 
|-id=977 bgcolor=#d6d6d6
| 254977 ||  || — || September 24, 2005 || Palomar || NEAT || — || align=right | 3.5 km || 
|-id=978 bgcolor=#d6d6d6
| 254978 ||  || — || September 24, 2005 || Palomar || NEAT || EOS || align=right | 2.2 km || 
|-id=979 bgcolor=#d6d6d6
| 254979 ||  || — || September 22, 2005 || Palomar || NEAT || — || align=right | 3.2 km || 
|-id=980 bgcolor=#d6d6d6
| 254980 ||  || — || September 22, 2005 || Palomar || NEAT || — || align=right | 3.4 km || 
|-id=981 bgcolor=#d6d6d6
| 254981 ||  || — || September 22, 2005 || Palomar || NEAT || — || align=right | 4.2 km || 
|-id=982 bgcolor=#d6d6d6
| 254982 ||  || — || September 22, 2005 || Palomar || NEAT || KOR || align=right | 1.7 km || 
|-id=983 bgcolor=#E9E9E9
| 254983 ||  || — || September 23, 2005 || Kitt Peak || Spacewatch || — || align=right | 3.3 km || 
|-id=984 bgcolor=#d6d6d6
| 254984 ||  || — || September 23, 2005 || Kitt Peak || Spacewatch || KOR || align=right | 2.0 km || 
|-id=985 bgcolor=#E9E9E9
| 254985 ||  || — || September 23, 2005 || Kitt Peak || Spacewatch || AGN || align=right | 1.7 km || 
|-id=986 bgcolor=#E9E9E9
| 254986 ||  || — || September 23, 2005 || Anderson Mesa || LONEOS || 526 || align=right | 3.1 km || 
|-id=987 bgcolor=#E9E9E9
| 254987 ||  || — || September 27, 2005 || Kitt Peak || Spacewatch || — || align=right | 2.8 km || 
|-id=988 bgcolor=#d6d6d6
| 254988 ||  || — || September 29, 2005 || Anderson Mesa || LONEOS || SAN || align=right | 1.8 km || 
|-id=989 bgcolor=#d6d6d6
| 254989 ||  || — || September 29, 2005 || Mount Lemmon || Mount Lemmon Survey || BRA || align=right | 1.5 km || 
|-id=990 bgcolor=#E9E9E9
| 254990 ||  || — || September 23, 2005 || Kitt Peak || Spacewatch || DOR || align=right | 3.9 km || 
|-id=991 bgcolor=#d6d6d6
| 254991 ||  || — || September 26, 2005 || Kitt Peak || Spacewatch || — || align=right | 3.6 km || 
|-id=992 bgcolor=#d6d6d6
| 254992 ||  || — || September 29, 2005 || Kitt Peak || Spacewatch || CHA || align=right | 2.5 km || 
|-id=993 bgcolor=#d6d6d6
| 254993 ||  || — || September 25, 2005 || Apache Point || A. C. Becker || — || align=right | 2.3 km || 
|-id=994 bgcolor=#E9E9E9
| 254994 ||  || — || October 1, 2005 || Catalina || CSS || GEF || align=right | 2.1 km || 
|-id=995 bgcolor=#E9E9E9
| 254995 ||  || — || October 1, 2005 || Catalina || CSS || HOF || align=right | 3.1 km || 
|-id=996 bgcolor=#d6d6d6
| 254996 ||  || — || October 1, 2005 || Catalina || CSS || — || align=right | 3.7 km || 
|-id=997 bgcolor=#E9E9E9
| 254997 ||  || — || October 1, 2005 || Catalina || CSS || — || align=right | 3.9 km || 
|-id=998 bgcolor=#d6d6d6
| 254998 ||  || — || October 1, 2005 || Kitt Peak || Spacewatch || FIR || align=right | 4.4 km || 
|-id=999 bgcolor=#E9E9E9
| 254999 ||  || — || October 2, 2005 || Mount Lemmon || Mount Lemmon Survey || — || align=right | 3.0 km || 
|-id=000 bgcolor=#d6d6d6
| 255000 ||  || — || October 1, 2005 || Mount Lemmon || Mount Lemmon Survey || — || align=right | 2.7 km || 
|}

References

External links 
 Discovery Circumstances: Numbered Minor Planets (250001)–(255000) (IAU Minor Planet Center)

0254